The One Piece manga features an extensive cast of characters created by Eiichiro Oda. The series takes place in a fictional universe where vast numbers of pirates, soldiers, revolutionaries, and other adventurers fight each other, using various superhuman abilities. The majority of the characters are human, but the cast also includes dwarfs, giants, mermen and mermaids, fishmen, sky people, and minks, and many others. Many of the characters possess abilities gained by eating "Devil Fruits". The series' storyline follows the adventures of a group of pirates as they search for the mythical "One Piece" treasure.

Monkey D. Luffy is the series' main protagonist, a young pirate who wishes to succeed Gol D. Roger, the deceased King of the Pirates, by finding his treasure, the "One Piece". Throughout the series, Luffy gathers himself a diverse crew, named the Straw Hat Pirates, including: the three-sword-wielding combatant Roronoa Zoro (sometimes referred to as Roronoa Zoro in the English manga); the thief and navigator Nami; the cowardly marksman and inventor Usopp; the amorous cook and martial artist Sanji; the anthropomorphic reindeer and doctor Tony Tony Chopper; the archaeologist Nico Robin; the cyborg shipwright Franky; the living skeleton musician Brook; and the fish-man helmsman Jimbei. Together they sail the seas in pursuit of their dreams, encountering other pirates, bounty hunters, criminal organizations, revolutionaries, secret agents and soldiers of the corrupt World Government, and various other friends and foes.

Creation and conception

Several characters have been stated to be based on actual pirates and sailors such as: Eustass Kid (Eustace the Monk and William Kidd), X. Drake (Sir Francis Drake), Basil Hawkins (Basil Ringrose and John Hawkins), Capone Bege (Al Capone and William Le Sauvage), Jewelry Bonney (Anne Bonny), Urouge (Aruj and Oruç Reis), Alvida (Awilda), Bartolomeo (Bartholomew Roberts), Bellamy (Samuel Bellamy), Blackbeard (Edward Teach), Cavendish (Thomas Cavendish), Charlotte Linlin (Big Mom) (Charlotte Badger), Gol D Roger (Olivier Levasseur), Lafitte (Jean Lafitte), Roronoa Zoro (François l'Olonnais), Silvers Rayleigh (Sir Walter Raleigh), Thatch (Edward Thatch), Yorki (Calico Jack), Zeff and Sanji ("Red Legs" Greaves), Trafalgar D. Water Law (Edward Low), Barbarossa (Hayreddin Barbarossa), and Scratchmen Apoo (Chui A-poo). The cross dresser Emporio Ivankov is based on Dr. Frank N. Furter and Norio Imamura. Norio had asked Oda to draw more okama (homosexual) characters and became Ivankov's first voice actor.

Oda had created Helmeppo before he created Captain Morgan, Helmeppo's father. Oda originally named Morgan after "Chop", with the character's full title being "Naval Captain Chop" or "Sailor Chop". He created several versions of Morgan before settling on the final design. After an editor told him that Morgan, in Oda's words, "looked lame", he changed the design to its final style.

The Straw Hat Pirates

The crew's number increases throughout the series, as Luffy recruits new members. Once Usopp joins the Straw Hat Pirates, they gain their own ship, the Going Merry, which is later destroyed and replaced by a larger and more powerful vessel, the Thousand Sunny created by their shipwright Franky. Two years later, the Straw Hats gain a new fleet, called the Straw Hat Grand Fleet, consisting of 5,640 pirates from seven different crews; Luffy objects to the idea of being a fleet commander, and organizes his new army in a way that they may act independently, but when one crew is in trouble, the others must do what they can to help them. By the end of the Wano Arc, the Straw Hat Pirates are recognized as a Emperor crew after the defeat of both Kaido and Big Mom.

Monkey D. 

 is the main protagonist of the One Piece series. At age seven, he admires and tries to join the pirates of the "Red Haired" Shanks. Ridiculed and rejected, he inadvertently eats their treasure, the Paramecia-type , which gives him rubbery attributes. His reckless efforts ultimately lead him into grave peril causing Shanks to lose an arm while rescuing him. After this, Luffy gives up on joining Shanks, resolving instead to start a crew of his own and become King of the Pirates. Displeased by Shanks spoiling his grandson, Garp takes Luffy to be raised by Curly Dadan and her mountain bandits, who he strong-arms into taking him in. During Luffy's time there, he becomes a sworn brother with Ace, Garp's other ward, and Sabo, a local runaway noble.

Eventually, after his strength proves insufficient to save Ace from execution, he spends two years on a secluded island, learning the use of the three colors of Haki as well as his rubber ability's fourth Gear from Silvers Rayleigh, before heading to the New World. Due to his infamy, he is one of the pirates who are known as "The Worst Generation". After the defeat of Kaido and Big Mom, he is subsequently named one of the newest members of the Four Emperors. Luffy Is also capable of using the advanced application for all types of Haki.

Luffy is voiced by Mayumi Tanaka in the anime series. In the 4Kids Entertainment English adaptation, he is voiced by Erica Schroeder. In the Funimation Entertainment English adaptation, his voice is supplied by Colleen Clinkenbeard.

Luffy will be portrayed by Iñaki Godoy in the live-action adaptation of One Piece.

Roronoa 

 is a swordsman who uses up to three swords simultaneously, holding one in each hand and a third in his mouth. To fulfill a promise to Kuina, his deceased childhood friend and rival, he aims to defeat "Hawk Eye" Mihawk and become the world's greatest swordsman.

Eventually, he comes into conflict with Helmeppo, the spoiled son of a navy officer. To prevent the harm of innocent civilians, Zoro allows himself to be incarcerated temporarily, while Helmeppo plots to have him killed. Zoro is saved from execution by Luffy in exchange for becoming his first crewman. At that point, Zoro makes it clear that he would turn on his captain if he ever stepped between him and his dream. However, Zoro grows fond of his crew and after several defeats in their defense, his priorities change and he convinces Mihawk to take him on as a student. Zoro is capable of utilizing all three types of Haki and is capable of using the advanced application for both and Haoshoku and Busoshoku Haki. He is known for his awful sense of direction and constantly gets lost when traveling.

In the anime television series, his voice actor is Kazuya Nakai. In the 4Kids English adaptation, his name is spelled Roronoa Zolo, and he is voiced by Marc Diraison. The VIZ media also calls him "Zolo". In the Funimation English adaptation, his voice is supplied by Christopher Sabat.

Zoro will be portrayed by Mackenyu in the live-action adaptation of One Piece.

Nami

Adopted and raised by navy seaman turned tangerine farmer Belle-Mère,  witness their mother being murdered by the infamous Arlong, whose pirate gang occupies their island and extracts tribute from the population. Striking a deal with him, Nami, still a child, but already an accomplished cartographer who dreams of drawing a complete map of the world, joins the pirates, hoping to buy freedom for her village eventually. Growing up as a pirate-hating pirate drawing maps for Arlong and stealing treasure from other pirates, Nami becomes an excellent burglar, pickpocket, and navigator with an exceptional ability to forecast weather.

In the anime television series, Nami is voiced by Akemi Okamura. In the 4Kids English adaptation, she is voiced by Kerry Williams. In the Funimation English adaptation, her voice is provided by Luci Christian.

Nami will be portrayed by Emily Rudd in the live-action adaptation of One Piece.

Usopp

During his early childhood,  is abandoned by his father, Yasopp, who leaves to join the Red-Haired Pirates. As his mother, Bachina, falls ill, Usopp starts telling tall tales, expressing his hope that his father will return and take them out to sea. He regularly goes to the mansion at the top of the hill where he lives, to visit Kaya. Even after his mother dies, Usopp does not blame his father for leaving. Despite his cowardly disposition, he strives to become a great pirate.

Usopp is recognizable for his long nose, a reference to the fact that he tends to lie a lot. He is a gifted inventor, painter, and sculptor. In combat, he relies primarily on slingshots to fire various kinds of ammunition with great precision in coordination with a set of lies and other weapons giving him a unique fighting style named "The Usopp Arsenal". To help the Straw Hats rescue Nico Robin, he achieves notoriety under his alter-ego , a hero sniper wearing a golden mask and cape.

In the anime series, his voice actor is Kappei Yamaguchi. Jason Griffith and Sonny Strait provide his voice in the 4Kids and Funimation English adaptations, respectively.

Usopp will be portrayed by Jacob Romero Gibson in the live-action adaptation of One Piece.

Sanji

Born as a prince of Germa Kingdom,  is routinely ridiculed by his genetically enhanced siblings and is locked away by his father Judge for being a disgrace. With help from his sister Reiju, he escapes and flees Germa, a floating kingdom composed of several ships, after it enters the East Blue and his father permits it.

While serving as an apprentice cook on a passenger ship, nine-year-old Sanji stands up to a boarding party of pirates led by the infamous "Red Foot" Zeff. During the encounter, Sanji is swept into the sea by a massive wave. While castaways together, the pirate saves Sanji's life yet again by giving him all of their food. Zeff in turn makes him a first-rate cook and teaches him his kick-based fighting style. Mirroring Zeff, Sanji will never refuse a starving person a meal, and he uses only his legs when fighting to protect the hands he needs for cooking. He has a weakness for women and makes it a principle never to harm one, even if it means his death.

Sanji receives his own Raid Suit from his family that grants him the ability to turn invisible. But he starts to realize this had also awakened his dormant genetic enhancements that his mother suppressed years ago. He had gained an exoskeleton, a superhuman physical constitution, accelerated healing, increase in strength and speed which enhanced his fighting style immensely and his skin has become bulletproof. Sadly, this had dampened his emotions as well when he realized he had hurt a woman unknowingly who unintentionally got his way and became extremely afraid of him. But that was eventually revealed to not be the case, as it is confirmed by Sanji that Queen used his invisibility to make it look like he did the beating. Fearing he is losing his heart and humanity, he destroys the Raid Suit canister, freeing himself from Germa's influence for good and stopping him from losing more of himself.  

Sanji's standard appearance is wearing a well-fitting black suit with a skinny black tie. His hair always covers one of his eyes and he is usually smoking a cigarette.

In the anime television series, he is voiced by Hiroaki Hirata. In the 4Kids English adaptation, he is voiced by David Moo. In the Funimation English adaptation, his voice is supplied by Eric Vale.

Sanji will be portrayed by Taz Skylar in the live-action adaptation of One Piece.

Tony Tony 

 is a doctor and a blue-nosed reindeer. The power of the Zoan-type  provides him with the ability to transform into a full-sized reindeer or a reindeer-human hybrid. A self-developed drug he calls  enables him to perform even more transformations for three minutes. With help from Caesar Clown, Chopper can last in his transformations for about 30 minutes.

Rejected by his herd because of his blue nose and eating the Devil Fruit, Chopper is rescued by Drum Island's quack doctor Doctor Hiriluk. While developing a potion to create cherry blossoms when in contact with snow, Chopper is heartbroken when Hiriluk falls ill with a deadly disease. After Hiriluk's death, Doctor Kureha takes him in as his mentor. After the Straw Hats arrive at  Drum Island and take Chopper with them, Kureha uses Hiriluk's potion to turn the snowy sky into cherry blossoms, fulfilling Hiriluk's life mission. When complimented, Chopper acts flustered and sometimes yells at the person who complimented him to stop trying to make him happy. A running gag within the series is when other characters mistake him as a Tanuki, and he angrily corrects them, pointing out that he is a Tonakai (Japanese for "Reindeer").

Chopper's voice actress is Ikue Ōtani. Kazue Ikura voiced Tony Tony Chopper for episodes 254–263. Brina Palencia voices Chopper in the English Funimation dub.

When creating Chopper, Oda wanted a mascot who is both cute and very weak. An IGN review of the manga praised Chopper's character as one of the best in the series and said that he was able to be both touching and funny. With Chopper's back story, Oda wanted to illustrate that one need not be blood-related to be considered family.

Nico 

At some point she gains the power of the Paramecia-type , which allows her to have temporary copies of parts of her body, including her eyes and ears, which spring up on surfaces near her. Behind her teachers' backs, she acquires from them the outlawed knowledge of how to translate the ancient stones called , which are scattered around the world. She comes to share their goal of finding the elusive , which is said to tell the world's lost history. However, the World Government finds out about these efforts and sends a battlefleet to stop them. Only Robin escapes the devastating attack that claims the lives of the island's entire population, including that of her mother.

Called , traumatized, and with a bounty on her head, Robin lives a life on the run, unable to trust anyone. To survive, she cooperates with various pirates and other outlaws. She eventually joins Sir Crocodile's Baroque Works group, using the codename  and becomes their vice-president. After Baroque Works falls apart, with nowhere else to go, she tags along with the Straw Hat Pirates and grows so fond of them that she gives herself up to the Government in order to save them. After they discover her real reason for leaving, the Straw Hat Pirates declare open war against the Government to get her back. She realizes that she has finally found people who will never sell her out and becomes part of the crew. Two years later, Robin further hones her Devil Fruit powers to the point she can create a full-bodied duplicate of herself.

In the anime television series adaptation of the manga, Robin's voice actress is Yuriko Yamaguchi. In the 4Kids English adaptation, her Baroque Works codename was changed to Miss Sunday and she is voiced by Veronica Taylor. In the Funimation English adaptation, her voice is supplied by Stephanie Young.

Franky
Franky's recklessness eventually provides an opportunity for World Government agents seeking these plans. Attempting to rescue his master, Franky suffers severe injuries and only survives by rebuilding parts of his body using pieces of scrap metal, turning himself into a cola-powered cyborg with strength.

In the anime television series, his voice actor is Kazuki Yao. Patrick Seitz provides his voice in the Funimation English adaptation.

Brook
Already a pirate before the time of Roger, "Humming"  first enters the Grand Line as a member of the music-themed Rumbar Pirates. Leaving their pet the infant whale  at Reverse Mountain, they promise to return after sailing around the world. After losing their captain , Brook took over the crew as the new captain. Time later, they are annihilated, but the power of the Paramecia-type  allows "Dead Bones" Brook to rise again and live a second life as a skeleton. Fifty years later, Brook's goal is still to fulfill his late crew's promise, and to that end he joins the Straw Hat Pirates.

He is an excellent musician, who says that he can play any instrument, although he is usually seen playing the violin. Brook can even influence people with his music to the point of making them fall asleep. While separated from the other Straw Hats, and incognito as "Soul King" Brook, he gains world fame, filling concert halls with fans. He is also a skilled fencer who uses a shikomizue (a Japanese cane sword) in battle. His reduced weight allows him to jump extraordinarily high and to run across water. Eventually, Brook  learns how to use his Devil Fruit ability to leave his skeleton body and explore his surroundings as a disembodied soul.

The idea of a skeleton musician was first conceived by Oda in 2000, about the time of Laboon's introduction and more than half a decade before the first appearance of Brook.

He is voiced by Chō. Ian Sinclair provides his voice in the Funimation English adaptation.

Jimbei
 is a yakuza-esque whale shark-type fish-man. Jimbei can communicate with fish, an ability more usually associated with merfolk, and enlist the help of whale sharks. After growing up in a rough part of Fish-Man Island, Jimbei first joins the island's royal army and later the Sun Pirates; he becomes captain following the death of Fisher Tiger. In exchange for the World Government granting him Warlord-status and amnesty to the Sun Pirates, Jimbei eventually disbands the crew. He resigns the position to side against the Government during its war with the Whitebeard Pirates, the protectors of Fish-Man Island. Two years later, he enlists the help of the Straw Hat Pirates to prevent the New Fish-Man Pirates' coup d'état against Fish-Man Island's royal family. Jimbei then turns down an invitation from Luffy to join his crew, having already aligned with the Big Mom Pirates after the death of Whitebeard. After cutting ties with Big Mom, he joins the Straw Hat Pirates as the crew's helmsman.

In the Japanese anime television series, Jimbei is initially voiced by Daisuke Gōri, later by Katsuhisa Hōki. In the Funimation English adaptation, his voice is supplied by Daniel Baugh.

Other pirates

The following are the known pirate crews:

Arlong Pirates
The  are a pirate crew consisting mostly of fishmen led by the sawshark-type fishman Arlong and several officers.

Hatchan and Nami used to be members until the latter left the crew following its defeat by the Straw Hat Pirates.

Arlong
 is a sawshark-type fishman and fishman-supremacist. Growing up in a rough part of Fishman Island, he becomes captain of the Arlong Pirates, who temporarily merge with other fishmen to form the Sun Pirates. Arlong's powerful jaws have rapidly re-growing teeth capable of rending stone. His favorite weapon is the sword-like  with its six tooth-shaped blades.

In the original Japanese series, his voice actor is Jūrōta Kosugi. In the 4Kids English adaptation, he is voiced by David Wills. In the Funimation English adaptation, his voice is supplied by Chris Rager.

Hatchan
, often called , is an octopus-type fishman first introduced as the first mate of the Arlong Pirates. Being half octopus, he can spit large quantities of black ink and use suction pads to stick to walls. He fights using six swords, holding one in each arm-tentacle. After his crew is defeated by the Straw Hat Pirates, he escapes from captivity and opens a floating takoyaki restaurant. Hachi later attempts to make things right with the Straw Hat Pirates by bringing them in contact with Silvers Rayleigh.

His voice actor is Toshiyuki Morikawa. In the 4Kids and Funimation English adaptations, his voice is supplied by Sean Schemmel and George Manley, respectively.

Kuroobi
 is a manta ray-type fishman who uses "Fishman Karate".

Choo
 is a Japanese whiting-type fishman who spits water as if they were firing bullets

Bellamy Pirates
The  is a pirate crew originating from the North Blue, and allies with the Donquixote Pirates. The captain of the crew is Bellamy "the Hyena". Other members of the crew are: "Big Knife" , a blue-haired bespectacled man who is Bellamy's first mate; Lily, a woman who often accompanied Sarquiss; Eddy, the navigator; Muret, the doctor; Hewitt, the cook; Rivers, the sniper; Ross, the swordsman; and Mani, the combatant.

Bellamy
, is the captain of the Bellamy Pirates, a blonde-haired man with the power of the Paramecia-type , which allows him to turn his legs into springs to bounce off surfaces and gain momentum for his attacks. After his defeat at the hands of Luffy, Doflamingo dismisses Bellamy, who later becomes a fighter in Dressrosa.

In the anime television series, Bellamy's voice actor is Wataru Takagi. In the 4Kids English adaptation, he is voiced by Andrew Rannells. In the Funimation English adaptation, his voice is supplied by Justin Cook.

Bliking Pirates
The  are a group of pirates that originate from Drum Island. They consist of:

Wapol
 is the former King of Drum Island. He ate the Paramecia-type  which allows him to eat virtually anything and take on its properties. His crew consists mostly of his former army.

Chess
 is an underling of Wapol who is a skilled archer.

Kuromarimo
 is an underling of Wapol whose fighting style revolves around throwing parts of his Afro hair-cut.

Black Cat Pirates
The Black Cat Pirates are a cat-themed crew of pirates led by their captain, Kuro, who considers them as nothing but pawns to carry out his plans and, if he so pleases, to die for him..

Kuro
, nicknamed , is the captain of the Black Cat Pirates, who is known for his elaborate plans. Wishing to leave his identity behind, and to escape the pirate lifestyle of always being on the run, he becomes butler to Kaya, a friend of Usopp. He considers his crew as nothing but pawns to carry out his plans and, if he so pleases, to die for him. Kuro fights using a pair of gloves equipped with very long, straight, single edged blades. Wearing these, he adopted his signature habit of adjusting his constantly slipping glasses by using only the palm of his hand to avoid cutting his face. Carl Kimlinger of Anime News Network praised Kuro as being "both unspeakably cool and utterly vile".

In the anime, Kuro resumed pirate life following his defeat and saw that the bounty for Luffy has gone up following Arlong's defeat.

In the Japanese anime television series, Kuro is voiced by Kōichi Hashimoto. In the 4Kids English adaptation, he is voiced by Gary Mack, while his voice actor in the Funimation English adaptation is Kent Williams.

Caribou Pirates
The  is a pirate group that encountered the Straw Hat Pirates after they got back together.

"Wet-Haired"  is a rookie pirate and co-captain of the Caribou Pirates. He consumed the Swamp-Swamp Fruit which enables him to generate, control, and become a "swamp".

"Blood Splatterer"  is the egg-shaped brother of Caribou and co-captain of the Caribou Pirates.

Dracule Mihawk
, also called , was one of the Seven Warlords of the Sea, and is recognized as the strongest swordsman in the world. He is a pale-skinned man who travels in a small boat shaped like a coffin. His primary weapon is a Grosse Messer, with a black blade called yoru. Zoro wants to beat him someday, however, he trains Zoro for two years, knowing he will only forfeit his pride and ask for guidance in the way of the sword if it means helping another.

Takeshi Aono provided his voice in the anime until 2010, after which he was replaced by Hirohiko Kakegawa. In the 4Kids English adaptation, he is voiced by Wayne Grayson. In the Funimation English adaptation, his voice is supplied by John Gremillion.

Donquixote Pirates
It is divided into three groups, each led by one of the top three officers: Trebol's Army, Diamante's Army and Pica's Army. Other members of the crew were Bellamy, the former officer Monet, and the former top officer . Caesar Clown and Disco are also subordinates of the crew.

Donquixote Doflamingo
 is the captain of the Donquixote Pirates, the usurper king of the island Dressrosa, and formerly one of the Seven Warlords of the Sea. The  grants him the ability to control others using movements with his fingers similar to that of a puppeteer. It also grants him the ability to control sharp thin strings from his fingertips that can cut people, create clones of himself, and attach to the clouds in the sky to allow him to fly.. he is also capable of utilizing all three types of Haki. He is also a former Celestial Dragon after his father, Donquixote Homing, decided to abandon that life to become a normal human. However, they were chased by the people, tortured, and eventually, Doflamingo killed his dad. He brought the head of his father back to Mariejois in hopes of receiving his Celestial title back again. He was denied and later became a pirate.

He believes that the "Great Pirate Era" is nearing its end and a new age is about to begin. He is a broker going under the alias of "Joker". He owns a large auction house at the Sabaody Archipelago where humans and other species are sold as slaves. Eventually, after the Straw Hat Pirates and Dressrosa's citizens reveal his treacherous deeds, Doflamingo is defeated by Luffy and his title is revoked.

He is voiced by Hideyuki Tanaka. In the Funimation English adaptation, his voice is supplied by Robert McCollum.

Donquixote Rosinante
 is the younger brother of Donquixote Doflamingo, a commander of the Donquixote Pirates occupying the Hearts Seat under the code name , and an undercover agent from the Navy with the rank of commander who reports directly to the then Admiral Sengoku. He also makes use of this ability to make his elder brother believe that he has lost the power of speech after an unknown accident. He is the second person to occupy the Hearts Seat, his predecessor being Vergo. Donquixote Rosinante is clumsy and is most often seen lighting his feather cloak up while trying to light a cigarette. He was killed years ago by Doflamingo.

In the Japanese anime television series, he is voiced by Koichi Yamadera. In the Funimation English adaptation, his voice is supplied by Ray Chase.

Trébol's Army
Trébol's Army consists of:

  - The leader of his army with the powers of the Stick-Stick Fruit (ベタベタの実, Beta Beta no Mi) which allows him to generate an adhesive and highly sticky liquid.
  - A girl with the powers of the Hobby-Hobby Fruit (ホビホビの実, Hobi Hobi no Mi) which allows her to turn people into toys.
  - A woman with the powers of the Art-Art Fruit (アトアトの実, Ato Ato no Mi) which allows her to transform things into modern art.
  - A woman who with the powers of the Glare-Glare Fruit (ギロギロの実, Giro Giro no Mi) which allows her to see through everything and read other's minds. "Violet" is actually a codename used to infiltrate the Donquixote Pirates, her true identity is the Princess Viola of Dresserosa.

Diamante's Army
Diamante's Army consists of:

  - The leader of his army who has the powers of the Ripple-Ripple Fruit (ヒラヒラの実, Hira Hira no Mi) which allows him to flatten, reform, and fold anything while still retaining its original characteristics.
  - An old skilled martial artist obsessed with the letter G.
  - A strong man with the powers of the Ton-Ton Fruit (トントンの実, Ton Ton no Mi) which allows him to change his weight at will.
  - A "hard boiled" man with the power of the Swim-Swim Fruit (スイスイの実, Sui Sui no Mi) which allows him to swim through the ground or walls.
  - A boy who is a hybrid of a human and a Siamese fighting fish-type fishman. He primarily fights with kicks.

Pica's Army
Pica's Army consists of:

  - A large, musclar man with a comically high voice with the powers of the Stone-Stone Fruit (イシイシの実, Ishi Ishi no Mi), which allows him to absorb, manipulate, and merge with stone.
  - A girl with the powers of the Arms-Arms Fruit (ブキブキの実, Buki Buki no Mi) which allows her change any part of her body into any kind of weapon. She later defected to the Happosui Army and married Sai.
  - A man with the powers of the Spin-Spin Fruit (グルグルの実, Guru Guru no Mi) which allows him to rotate any part of his body like a propeller.
  - A man with the powers of the Pop-Pop Fruit (パムパムの実, Pamu Pamu no Mi) which allows him to make his own body or any inorganic object he touches rupture and explode.

Edward Weevil 
, also called , is the self-proclaimed son of Edward Newgate, and was one of the Seven Warlords of the Sea. He is not very bright, and as a result, he is constantly manipulated by his mother, a former pirate and the self-proclaimed lover of Edward Newgate. Influenced by his mother, Weevil believe that he is the rightful heir of Whitebeard's fortune, not the members of his father's crew, and in order to claim Whitebeard's treasure that Buckin promised him, he fought and destroyed fifteen pirate crews that served under Whitebeard.

Flying Pirates
The Flying Pirates are a group of fishman pirates that was originally founded by Vander Decken. They eventually make a pact with the New Fishman Pirates to plot the complete destruction of Fishman Island by initiating a coup d'etat.

Vander Decken IX
 is a Japanese bullhead shark-type fishman with the power of the Paramecia-type  that enables him to lock on any target at will so long as he touches the target first. Even though he still can survive underwater, he would need assistance to get out of the ocean.

Foxy Pirates
The  is a crew specializing in a pirate game known as the "Davy Back Fight" wherein pirate crews can win crewmen from their opponents and their Jolly Roger. One example is when he won the Fanged Toad Pirates' captain Kibagaeru, its unnamed helmsman, and its unnamed navigator as well as their Jolly Roger leaving the rest of the Fanged Toad Pirates in dissaray.

The crew is led by Foxy, and other members of his numerous crew include:, Porche, the crew's idol; Hamburg, a gorilla-like human who occasionally serves as Foxy's mount and leader of the Groggy Monsters; Pickles is a large and husky man who is larger than Hamburg and a member of the Groggy Monsters; Big Pan is a Wotan, a result of a union between a giant and a fish-man with his fish-type being a pond loach and a member of the Groggy Monsters; Itomimizu, The announcer and commentator; Chuchun, Itomimizu's pet bird; Capote, a billfish-type fish-man; Monda, a star shark; and an unnamed referee who during Davy Back Fight games ignores his team's cheating.

The Foxy Pirates have some anime-only members: Mashikaku, a large and rectangular man; Chiqicheetah, a crew member who unnamed Devil Fruit enables him to turn into a cheetah and a cheetah-human hybrid; Jube, a squid-type fish-man; Girarin, an unspecified fish-man; and Rokuroshi, an elderly referee.

Foxy
, nicknamed , is the cheater and trickster captain of the Foxy Pirates. Though he acts supremely confident most of the time, he is extremely sensitive to insults or criticism.

Although in the manga he only appears as the main antagonist of a story arc, in the anime he is a recurring opponent of Luffy's crew.

In the Japanese series, he is voiced by Bin Shimada, while his voice actor in the Funimation English adaptation is Jonathan Brooks.

Krieg Pirates
The Krieg Pirates are a pirate crew led by Don Krieg. The crew consisted of the largest pirate fleet in the East Blue, until their ships were sunk by Dracule Mihawk.

Don Krieg
, nicknamed , is the captain of the Krieg Pirates, a man well known for his underhanded tactics. Krieg does not care for his crew and bullies them into fearing and obeying him. He punishes those who fail him and those who show weakness. Krieg wears a gilded suit of steel armor filled with hidden weapons such as guns, bombs, etc. Krieg also uses a weapon called the "Mighty Battle Spear", that is not only a spear, but can release explosions and remain intact.

Gin
 is Krieg's combat commander. He arrived at the Baratie restaurant hungry, being saved by Sanji, who offered him a plate of food, after which Gin was grateful to the cook. Because of this, he ended up rebelling against his captain, especially once he ended up being defeated by Luffy, because he lost all the respect he had for him, thinking that he was someone indestructible.

Pearl
 is a man protected by various shields. Although it is difficult to hurt him, he gets very nervous if someone does the slightest injury to him, worrying everyone including his captain, as he begins to lose control.

Kuja

Boa Hancock

 is a member of the all-female Kuja Tribe from the island of Amazon Lily. Sold to the Celestial Dragons during childhood, she and her sisters are force-fed devil fruits and branded as slaves. Eventually freed by Fisher Tiger, the three return to their people. Despite resenting the World Government for her past enslavement, which she keeps a secret even from her kinswomen, Hancock accepts the position to protect her people. But when called upon to participate in the Government's war against the Whitebeard Pirates, she initially refuses and only reconsiders after falling in love with Luffy, who enlists her help to infiltrate Impel Down. Hancock is capable of utilizing all three types of Haki, The ability of the Paramecia-type  allows her to turn anyone charmed by her into stone and back again. She is also often accompanied by her pet snake , who also supports her in battles. After the most recent Levely, the Seven Warlords were disbanded, making her an enemy of the World Government again. A few weeks after her home was invaded by the Marines and the Blackbeard Pirates, she has decided to leave her home to protect her people and reunite with Luffy.

In the Japanese anime television series, her voice actress is Kotono Mitsuishi. In the Funimation English adaptation, her voice is supplied by Lydia Mackay.

Boa Sandersonia
 is the middle sister whose  enables her to transform into an anaconda or anaconda-human hybrid.

Boa Marigold
 is the middle sister whose  enables her to turn into a king cobra or king cobra-human hybrid.

Other Kuja members
Other members of the tribe are the former empress of the Kuja:

  - She is more commonly referred to as "Elder Nyon".
  - A warrior who befriends Luffy.
  - Margaret's friend.
  - Margaret's friend..

Monkey Mountain Allied Force
The  is a group formed between three pirate captains. Originally stationed in Jaya, they helped the Straw Hat Pirates in getting to Skypiea.

Cricket, believing that Noland was telling the truth, spent years searching for that city.

New Fishman Pirates
The  are a pirate group of fishmen-supremacists.The pirates eventually make a pact with the captain of the Flying Pirates to plot the complete destruction of Fishman Island by initiating a coup d'etat. Jones broadcasts a message to the island, announcing that he will execute Neptune, its current ruler, to take over the kingdom, and then kill the Straw Hat Pirates. However, Luffy eventually teams up with Jimbei, to launch a combined assault on the pirates – defeating them and saving Fishman Island.

, the great white shark-type fishman and leader of the New Fishman Pirates. Hordy is responsible for assassinating Otohime, the queen of Fishman Island.

Roger Pirates
The  were the pirate crew of the late King of the Pirates, Gol D. Roger, and were the only known crew to ever reach Raftel. Silvers Rayleigh was the crew's first mate. One of the members, was a man who was regarded by Roger as one of his best men along with Rayleigh. Shanks and Buggy - They started out as pirate apprentices on the crew. Because the legendary Samurai Kozuki Oden of Wano Country can read the Poneglyphs, he, alongside his wife Toki, children Momonosuke and Hiyori, as well as his retainers, Dogstorm and Cat Viper, accompanied Roger and his crew for 1 year with the goal of learning the secrets of the world (such as the void century, ancient weapons, and the D. family), as well as reaching the last island, Raftel.

Gol D. Roger
Suffering from a terminal disease, he takes his crew on a complete voyage through the Grand Line before disbanding it and turning himself in to the World Government, which claims to have captured him. At his execution, before Rouge gives birth to Roger's son Ace, and 22 years before the formation of the Straw Hat Pirates, Roger spawns the "Great Pirate Era" by announcing that his treasure, the "One Piece", is up for the taking, though they will have to find it first. It is said after Roger's death that only Whitebeard could match him in a fight and that he had the ability to hear "the voice of all things", which allowed him and his crew to learn the secret history of the world. He was also the original owner of Luffy's Straw Hat which fell into the possession of Shanks after his captain's death, with Shanks eventually passing it on to Luffy. Gol D. Roger has the highest known bounty in the series, with ฿ 5,564,800,000 Berry. Roger was capable of utilizing all three types of Haki. and was capable of using the advanced application for both and Haoshoku and Busoshoku Haki.

Roger is originally voiced by Chikao Ōtsuka, and later by Masane Tsukayama.  A younger Roger is voiced by Takeshi Kusao. In the 4Kids adaptation, Roger is voiced by Frederick B. Owens. Eric Stuart initially voiced Roger before being replaced with Owens. In the Funimation English adaptation, his voice is supplied by Sean Hennigan.

Silvers Rayleigh
The   is a swordsman who, after serving as first mate of the Roger Pirates, comes to live on the Sabaody Archipelago as a ship coater and gambler. Rayleigh is capable of utilizing all three types of Haki. and is capable of using the advanced application for both and Haoshoku and Busoshoku Haki. and, following the war between the Whitebeard Pirates and the World Government, instructs Luffy in its use.

In the anime adaptation, he is voiced by Keiichi Sonobe in Japanese, and by Bruce Carey in the Funimation English dub.

Rocks Pirates
There were also people who later became notorious such as the Emperors Edward Newgate, Charlotte Linlin, and Kaido, and the captain of the Golden Lion Pirates and Roger's rival .

Straw Hat Grand Fleet
The  is a fleet made up of seven pirate crews, who after having helped Luffy in Dressrosa, swore allegiance to him. A total of 5,639 pirates make up the entire grand fleet.

Beautiful Pirates
The  are the first crew of the Straw Hat Grand Fleet.

Barto Club
The  are the second crew of the Straw Hat Grand Fleet. All the members of the crew are big fans of Luffy.

Happosui Army
The  are the third crew of the Straw Hat Grand Fleet. He also is capable of utilizing all three types of Haki.

Ideo Pirates
The  are the fourth crew of the Straw Hat Grand Fleet. Initially. they were named , being renamed after obtaining their own ship.

Tontatta Pirates
The organization is made up entirely of dwarfs.

New Giant Pirates
The  are the sixth crew of the Straw Hat Grand Fleet.

Yontamaria Fleet
The  are the seventh crew of the Straw Hat Grand Fleet.

Rolling Pirates
A pirate crew that the Straw Hat Pirates met in Thriller Bark, being part of the victims whose shadows were stolen by Gecko Moria.

Lola ran away from Totto Land when her mother wanted her to marry Prince Loki of Elbaf, deciding to sail in the sea to find someone she truly loved. During her trip, she asked all the men she met if they wanted to marry her, eventually marrying Gotti.

Sun Pirates
They attack any pirate ship they see, but no matter who is on it, they never kill directly. Their Sun insignia was created to cover up the mark of the Celestial Dragon's slave, "Hoof of the Soaring Dragon", since Tiger Fisher bore the mark from being a slave. But he had escaped the World Nobles and during his escape he freed other mermen/fishmen and Boa Hancock and her two sisters. With the Sun insignia, the World Government was unable to claim the slaves due to mass confusion over whether they were Sun Pirates or not.

The members of the Arlong Pirates and Macro Pirates were also part of the crew, until the group eventually disbands when Jimbei joins the Seven Warlords of the Sea.

Thriller Bark Pirates
The crew of the island-sized ship , captained by Gecko Moriah, consists mostly of zombies, numbering in the hundreds, created from corpses. Some of these zombies have been sorted between the General Zombies and the Wild Zombies

Gecko Moria
 is the captain of the island-sized ship Thriller Bark and a former member of the Seven Warlords of the Sea. The  grants him the ability to control his shadow, allowing it to act completely independent from his body, and to control the shadows of others. After his entire crew is annihilated by Kaido, he creates a completely obedient, immortal army of zombies by implanting stolen shadows into corpses. After the Paramount War, his Warlord title is revoked.

In the Japanese anime television series, his voice actor is Katsuhisa Hōki. In the Funimation English adaptation, he is voiced by Chris Guerrero.

Perona
After Gecko Moria's defeat, Perona takes shelter in Dracule Mihawk's castle, where she begrudgingly helps and cooperates with Roronoa Zoro in his training during the timeskip.

In the original Japanese anime series, Perona is voiced by Kumiko Nishihara. In the Funimation English adaptation, her voice actress is Felecia Angelle.

Hogback
 is the medical genius of Moriah who was given unlife in the form of shadows stolen using Moriah's Devil Fruit ability. He was the one who patched up the corpses.

Absalom
"Graveyard"  is a patchwork man augmented by Hogback with the snout of a lion, the skin of an elephant, and the muscles of a bear and a gorilla. He can turn himself and anything he touches invisible thabnks to the Clear-Clear Fruit. Absalom was later killed by Shiryu of the Blackbeard Pirates who stole his Devil Fruit power.

Thriller Bark Zombies
Among the zombies created and/or reanimated by Hogback and Moriah are:

  - A former famous stage actress who has a strong hatred for plates and whom Dr. Hogback was in love with. 
  - A samurai from the Wano Country. He had the shadow of Brook
  — is a warthog-like zombie in love with Absalom. She had the shadow of Chalotte Lola.
  - A large monkey/spider Wild Zombie who is the commander of the Spider Mice.
  - A stuffed bear and servant of Perona who is the commander-in-chief of the Wild Zombies
  - A Wild Zombie that resembles a penguin with the snout of a bulldog who guards Hogback. He had the shadow of Sanji.
  - A General Zombie swordsman who once hosted Zoro's shadow.
  - An ancient giant formerly feared by all who was reanimated by Moria. He had the shadow of Luffy.

Worst Generation 

Basil Hawkins
, nicknamed , is the captain of the Hawkins Pirates. He can cover himself in straw and make scarecrow-like straw avatars to aid his offense. He also has a habit of reading tarot cards to find out what is going to happen, and the percentage probability that what he predicts will happen.

After the two year timeskip, he tried to form an alliance with Scratchmen Apoo and Eustass Kid, but after Kaido appeared in front of them, to avoid a fight he ended up joining the Animal Kingdom Pirates as Kaido's subordinate, betraying Kid along with Apoo, and becoming one of the crew's Headliners.

Capone Bege
 is a mafia don-turned-pirate.

During the two year time skip, Bege became one of the Big Mom Pirates' combatants, until the moment when he formed an alliance with Luffy and Caesar Clown to finish off Big Mom.

Eustass Kid
 is the captain of the Kid Pirates. Among his crew is his childhood friend Killer. He is also capable of utilizing all three types of Haki. During the time skip, he lost his arm after an encounter with.Shanks, depending on a metal pieces arm created by his ability. After trying to form an alliance with Scratchmen Apoo and Basil Hawkins, he ended up being betrayed by them and captured by Kaido, having to later ally himself with Luffy and Law in their plan to defeat him.

In the anime series, his voice actor is Daisuke Namikawa. In the Funimation English adaptation, his voice actor is Justin Cook.

Killer
, nicknamed  is the combatant of the Kid Pirates and Eustass Kid's childhood friend. He usually fights using two blades, and stands out for wearing a mask on his face.

To get revenge on Kaido, he and the Kid Pirates ended up joining Luffy and Law's alliance.

Jewelry Bonney
 is one of twelve pirates collectively known as the Worst Generation and the only female of the group. She is nicknamed  because of her gigantic appetite which, however, does not affect her sinuous figure. She has eaten an as-yet-unnamed Devil Fruit that allows her to change her own age (which she uses to disguise herself) as well as others, making her opponents either too young or too old to fight her.

After the Paramount War, she and her crew were defeated and captured by the Blackbeard Pirates, and she was subsequently arrested by the Navy fleet led by Sakazuki. Somehow, she managed to escape, showing herself wandering the streets incognito after the two year timeskip. During the World Meeting, she infiltrated Marijoa to rescue Bartholomew Kuma, who is later revealed to be her father.

In the Japanese anime series, Bonney is originally voiced by Reiko Kiuchi, who is later replaced by Reiko Takagi. In the Funimation English adaptation, she is voiced by Laura Wetsel.

Scratchmen Apoo

After the two year timeskip, he tried to form an alliance with Basil Hawkins and Eustass Kid. However, he was affiliated with Kaido to ambush them, Apoo being actually a subordinate of the Animal Kingdom Pirates, ending up with Hawkins joining Kaido and Apoo, and Kid being captured.

Trafalgar Law
Having eaten the Paramecia-type , Law can, after generating a blue spherical area around himself, cut and teleport objects as well as perform body swaps within said blue area. He is the captain of the Heart Pirates. Originally from the White Town, Flevance, he escaped with White Lead Disease and became a member of the Donquixote Pirates. There he met Corazon, the brother of Doflamingo, and together they went on an adventure to find a cure for Law. Ultimately they found the Devil Fruit, but before they escaped, Corazon was killed by Doflamingo, leaving Law to seek out revenge. Law makes a name for himself and following the Paramount War, Law joins the Seven Warlords of the Sea. Though he enters into an alliance with Luffy and the Straw Hats to take down Kaido, one of the Four Emperors, Law is actually hunting down Donquixote Doflamingo.

In the anime series, his voice actor is Hiroshi Kamiya. In the Funimation English adaptation, his voice actor is Matthew Mercer.

Heart Pirates
The , consisting of twenty-one members, is the pirate crew that is led by Trafalgar Law.

  - The polar bear-type mink and crew navigator.
  - An average-size lean man.
  - An average-size lean man who wears a hat with his name on it.
  - A former slave.

X. Drake
  is the captain of the Drake Pirates. He is a former Navy rear admiral who became a pirate, but secretly continued to work for the Navy as captain of the "SWORD" division. Under this identity, Drake managed to join the Animal Kingdom Pirates as Kaido's subordinate, becoming one of their Headliners as part of the Tobi Roppo. Drake is ousted once his treachery is uncovered, and he joins Luffy's alliance to take down Kaido.

Four Emperors
Initially the group consists of Shanks, Whitebeard, Kaido, and Big Mom, forming a precarious balance of power with The Seven Warlords of the Sea and the Navy Headquarters that keeps the world at peace until Blackbeard's capture of Ace. This leads to a war between the Whitebeard Pirates and the World Government, and results in Whitebeard's death. Two years later, Blackbeard is considered to have assumed Whitebeard's position. Following the events of the Onigashima war, where Big Mom and Kaido were defeated, Monkey D. Luffy and Buggy were considered the new members to replace them.

Animal Kingdom Pirates
The  are the crew led by Kaido, one of the Four Emperors. Most members possess powers of the SMILE fruits created by Caesar Clown, being able to obtain the abilities of a specific animal, but having only partially a part of the animal, such as the legs, ears, or the head, protruding from any limb of the body, like the head of an animal in the stomach or in the hand, wings in the head or the butt, and the legs being replaced with the actual animal where the user's torso is sticking out of their back.

Among the crew are the three groups: The Gifters, who ate a SMILE receiving their powers; The Pleasures who ate a dud SMILE without receiving any power and with the effect of not stopping smiling; and the Waiters, who await the moment in the future of receiving a SMILE.

The crew's second-grade officers after the Lead Performers are the Headliners, mostly elite Gifters, who are responsible for leading the Waiters, Pleasures, and lower Gifters.

Kaido
He is a former member of the Four Emperors, and also a former member of the Rocks Pirates. Kaido consumed the Fish-Fish Fruit: Azure Dragon Model which enables him to transform into an Azure Dragon or an Azure Dragon-human hybrid. In the past, he faced Kozuki Oden, who was the only person capable of deeply injuring him, leaving Kaido with a massive and permanent scar on his chest after nearly killing him. He was allied for years with Kurozumi Orochi to rule the Wano Country together, until Kaido betrayed him and announced his daughter Yamato would be the country's new shogun, which she vehemently opposed. Kaido had the highest active bounty of any current pirate, a bounty of ฿ 4,611,100,000. Kaido Is also capable of using the advanced application for all types of Haki.

Lead Performers
The three men who act as Kaido's right hand are the Lead Performers (or All-Stars), the crew's executives, also known as the Disasters/Calamities. The group consists of:

  - A Lunarian who can transform into a Pteranodon or a Pteranodon-human hybrid using the powers of the Dragon-Dragon Fruit: Model Pteranodon (Ryu Ryu no Mi: Model Pteranodon,リュウリュウの実 モデル プテラノドン). King has the epithet of "The Conflagration/Wildfire". 
  - A cyborg scientist who can transform into a Brachiosaurus or a Brachiosaurus-human hybrid using the powers of the Dragon-Dragon Fruit: Model Brachiosaurus (Ryu Ryu no Mi: Model Brachiosaurus, リュウリュウの実 モデル ブラキオサウルス"). Queen has the epithet of "The Plague". Queen is also a former colleague of Caesar Clown, Vinsmoke Judge of the Germa Kingdom, and Dr. Vegapunk as a part of MADS, a group of scientists. 
  - A giant grouper-type fishman who can transform into a mammoth or a mammoth-human hybrid using the powers of the Elephant-Elephant Fruit: Model Mammoth (Zou Zou no Mi, Model: Mammoth, ゾウゾウの実 モデル "マンモス"). Jack has the epithet of "The Drought".

Tobi Roppo
The Tobi Roppo are the six elite Headliners who serve directly under the Lead Performers. Like the Lead Performers, the members can transform into ancient creatures through their Ancient Zoan Devil Fruits. The group consists of:

  - A Headliner whose Devil Fruit called the Dragon-Dragon Fruit: Model Spinosaurus enables him to transform into a Spinosaurus or a Spinosaurus-human hybrid
  - A Headliner and Page One's sister whose Devil Fruit called the Dragon-Dragon Fruit: Model Pachycephalosaurus enables her to transform into a Pachycephalosaurus or a Pachycephalosaurus-human hybrid
  - A Headliner whose Devil Fruit called the Dragon-Dragon Fruit: Model Triceratops enables him to transform into a Triceratops or a Triceratops-human hybrid. He was in charge of the Armored Division (which consist of SMILE users based on hard-skinned or hard-shelled animals) before they were tamed by Tama.
  - A Headliner whose Devil Fruit called the Spider-Spider Fruit: Model Rosamygale Grauvogeli enables her to transform into a Rosamygale Grauvogeli or a Rosamygale Grauvogeli-human hybrid with a form of the latter having a drider-like appearance due to unidentified drugs.
  - A Headliner whose Devil Fruit called the Cat-Cat Fruit: Model Saber-Tooth Tiger enables him to transform into a saber-toothed tiger or a saber-toothed tiger-human hybrid.
 X. Drake was formerly a member of this group.

Headliners
The Headliners are the second-grade officers of the Beasts Pirates. They are in charge of the Pleasures and the Waiters.

Known Headliners include:

 Basil Hawkins
  - A Headliner who ate a Sheep SMILE that enables him to turn his hands into sheep horns.
  - A Headliner who has a variation of a Lion SMILE that gives his waist the head and legs of a lion named 
  - A Headliner whose Horse SMILE variation gives the area under her waist the body of a horse enabling her to have the appearance of a centaur.
  - A Headliner who has a Hippopotamus SMILE that infused his legs to a hippopotamus' body while his torso is in its mouth.
  - A Headliner whose unnamed SMILE has not had its abilities shown.
  - The warden of the Prisoner Mine who has an Elephant SMILE that gave him the head of an elephant on his belly.

Gifters

The Gifters are the elite soldiers of the Beast Pirates.

Pleasures

The Pleasures are the mid-level foot soldiers who ate the dud SMILE Fruits and can only feel joy.

Waiters

The Waiters are the low-level foot soldiers who haven't eaten a SMILE yet.

Numbers
The Numbers are a group of artificially-produced ancient giants with animalistic traits with most of them wearing tiger-striped loincloths that were produced on Punk Hazard as a failed experiment and were brought into the services of the Beast Pirates. In addition, they are also known to be messy drinkers where that habit annoys Queen. They consist of:

  - A Number who has a devil-like appearance.
  - A Number who has a centaur-like appearance due to him having consumed a Horse SMILE variant.
  - A Number who has slender outward horns.
  - A Number who has tusks.
  - A Number who has a long neck.
  - A Number who is bald, has black horns, body hair, and different tattoos on him.
  - A Number who resembles the traditional Oni while sporting a green beard and green hair.
  - A Number who resembles a larger horned human.
  - A Number who resembles a larger horned female human with snake-like fangs and waist-length hair.
  - A Number who has an elongated dragon-like head and a hunchbacked appearance.

Marys
The Marys are the surveillance crew of the Animal Kingdom Pirates that consist of humans and cyborg animals who wear paper masks and transmit their information to Kaido. The lead member of the Mary is:

  - A Mary who has a Flying Squirrel SMILE gives her a large flying squirrel tail protruding from her back as well as having gliding abilities.

Animal Kingdom Pirates' ninjas and samurai

There are also some ninjas and samurai that serve the Animal Kingdom Pirates.

Other Animal Kingdom Pirates members
Other members of the crew include:

  - A cyborg who protects one of the islands of Kaido.
 Scratchmen Apoo.

Blackbeard Pirates
The  are a group of very powerful pirates led by Blackbeard. While originally having five members, the Blackbeard Pirates' membership was later expanded with a number of prisoners from Impel Down and they even ally with Aokiji.

Marshall D. Teach
It grants him the ability to create and control black holes, which are represented as flowing darkness, as well as the ability to disable the Devil Fruit powers of others, as long as he is touching the person.

For betraying Whitebeard's crew and the murder of his crewmate, he is pursued by Ace who eventually confronts him. After defeating Ace and turning him in to the World Government, he is appointed Crocodile's replacement as one of the Seven Warlords of the Sea, a position he promptly abuses to expand his crew with prisoners from Impel Down and resigns once he is finished.

After killing Whitebeard with the help of his new crew, Blackbeard somehow adds his former captain's Devil Fruit ability to his own and manages to take Whitebeard's place as one of the Four Emperors.

The character is based on and named after the historical pirate Edward "Blackbeard" Teach. In the Japanese anime television series, his voice actor is Akio Ōtsuka. In its Funimation English adaptation, his voice was supplied by Cole Brown until his death in November 2016, being replaced by Chris Rager.

Ten Titanic Captains
Blackbeard's seconds in command:

  is the crew's helmsman who possesses immense physical strength. Burgess is the captain of the crew's 1st ship. Burgess has the epithet of "Champion". He was later revealed to have consumed a Devil Fruit called the Strong-Strong Fruit that gives him super-strength.
  is Impel Down's deposed chief jailer who later gained Absalom's invisibility. Shiryu is the captain of the crew's 2nd ship. Shiryu has the epithet of "Of the Rain".
  is the crew's marksman. Augur is the captain of the crew's 3rd ship. Augur has the epithet of "The Supersonic". He was later revealed to have consumed a Devil Fruit called the Warp-Warp Fruit that enables him to teleport himself and other people.
  is a man who was the tyrannical former king of a kingdom in the North Blue who Blackbeard sprung from Impel Down. Pizarro is the captain of the crew's 4th ship. Pizarro has the epithet of "Corrupt King".
  is an exiled police officer from the West Blue, who serves as the crew's navigator and chief of staff. Laffitte is the captain of the crew's 5th ship. Laffitte has the epithet of "Demon Sheriff". He is later implied to have consumed a Devil Fruit that enables him to sprout bird-like wings.
  is a woman and former inmate of Impel Down who can turn into a Kyubi no Kitsune or a Kyubi no Kitsune-human hybrid with the powers of the Dog-Dog Fruit: Model Nine Tailed Fox (イヌイヌの実 モデル九尾の狐, Inu Inu no Mi, Model: Kyubi no Kitsune), which also grants her the ability to transform into other people. Devon is the captain of the crew's 6th ship. Devon has the epithet of "Crescent Moon Hunter".
  is the biggest giant whose 519 ft. size comes from the ability of an as-yet-unnamed Devil Fruit. After Blackbeard sprung him from Impel Down, Wolf is the captain of the crew's 7th ship. Wolf has the epithet of "Colossal Battleship".
  is an 18 ft. legendary criminal with a love of alcoholic beverages. Shot is the captain of the crew's 8th ship. Shot has the epithet of "Heavy Drinker".
 , is the crew's sickly physician. Doc Q is the captain of the crew's 9th ship. Doc Q has the epithet of "Death God" or "Grim Reaper". Doc Q is later revealed to have consumed a Devil Fruit called the Sick-Sick Fruit that enables him to inflict diseases on anyone.
  is Doc Q's equally sickly horse who serves as Doc Q's mode of transportation due to Doc Q being too sickly to get around. He is later revealed to have consumed a Devil Fruit called the Horse-Horse Fruit: Model Pegasus that enables him to become a Pegasus.

It is unknown who is the captain of the fleet's 10th ship.

Big Mom Pirates
The  are the crew led by the member of the Four Emperors, Charlotte Linlin.

The Sun Pirates and the Firetank Pirates are former subordinates of the crew.

Charlotte Linlin
She is also the only female member of the Four Emperors, and a former member of the Rocks Pirates. She currently has the second-highest bounty of any pirate after Kaido, with a bounty of ฿ 4,388,000,000.

Big Mom possesses the power of the Soul-Soul Fruit, which in the past belonged to Carmel, with which she can give life to objects or make animals act like humans by giving them a fragment of a person's soul. The three objects close to her that have a fragment of her own soul are her tricorn , the sun , and the cloud . Big Mom is capable of utilizing all three types of Haki. and is capable of using the advanced application for both and Haoshoku and Busoshoku Haki.

Sweet Commanders
The highest-ranking members are known as the Sweet Commanders. The group consists of:

  is Lilin's 2nd son who has the power to generate mochi thanks to the powers of the Mochi-Mochi Fruit. He also capable of utilizing all three types of Haki. and is capable of using the advanced application for Kenbunshoku Haki.

  is Lilin's 14th daughter who has the ability to squeeze any object including living things thanks to the powers of the Wring-Wring Fruit.
  is Linlin's 10th son who has the ability to generate biscuits thanks to the powers of the Bis-Bis Fruit.

A former member of the group is Linlin's 25th child .

Big Mom Pirates' officers
Officer positions are filled by the majority of Linlin's sons and daughters. Among those are:

  is Linlin's 1st son who has the ability to generate candy thanks to the powers of the Lick-Lick Fruit.
  is Linlin's 3rd son who can summon a genie from his body by rubbing himself thanks to the powers of the Puff-Puff Fruit.
  is Linlin's 4th son who has the power to generate heat thanks to the powers of the Heat-Heat Fruit.
  is Linlin's 5th son who has the ability to generate cream thanks to the powers of the Cream-Cream Fruit.
  is Linlin's 8th daughter who has the power of mirrors thanks to the powers of the Mirror-Mirror Fruit which can also create reflections of people or trap them inside mirrors while gaining access to the Mirro-World.
  is Linlin's 19th son who can control the books and catch the people inside them thanks to the powers of the Book-Book Fruit.
  is Linlin's 35th daughter who is a descendant of the Three-Eyed People.
  is Linlin's 36th daughter who is a great admirer of Katakuri.

Big Mom Pirates' Combatants
The crew Combatants include:

  is a lion-type mink who can turn into a turtle thanks to the powers of the Turtle-Turtle Fruit giving him the appearance of a Tarasque.
  is an egg-shaped man who can change his appearance to chick, rooster, and egg form again thanks to the powers of the Egg-Egg Fruit.
  is a short and broad man.

Buggy's Band of Pirates
 is a circus-themed group of pirates led by Buggy the Clown, one of the Seven Warlords after the 2-year timeskip. Following Buggy's escape from Impel Down, the Buggy Pirates are joined by some of his fellow escapees.

Buggy
 is a pirate with a preference for fighting with knives, a love of cannons, and a prominent red nose. While a junior member of the Roger Pirates, he gets hold of a devil fruit and a treasure map, intending to sell the fruit and search for the treasure, but Shanks accidentally causes him to swallow the fruit and drop the map into the sea, earning Buggy's resentment. Having consumed the Paramecia-type , Buggy can separate his body into levitating parts and control them independently as long as they remain close, and at least one of his feet is on the ground. This ability also makes him immune to cutting attacks which will only separate him into parts.

In the anime series, his voice actor is Shigeru Chiba. In the 4Kids English adaptation, he is voiced by David Wills.  In the Funimation English adaptation, his voice is supplied by Mike McFarland.

Oda said that Buggy is his favorite antagonist, because of all of them he is the easiest to draw. Buggy has received much praise and criticism. Carl Kimlinger of Anime News Network said that Luffy's fight with Buggy "sets the series' precedent for battles that are simultaneously tense and hilarious". Jacob Hope Chapman of the same site said that seeing Buggy during the Jaya Arc was "entertaining". Bryce Coulter of Mania Entertainment praised Chibi Buggy's Adventure as one of the best arcs, and Buggy for his "slap-stick humour" and "Voltron-esque combining sequence". He was "disappointed" that Buggy, Smoker, and the Strawhats did not have a conflict at sea. On Luffy and Buggy's alliance in Impel Down, Chris Beveridge said, "the two do make an amusing pairing as their flight through the first level goes on". He went on to say, "he never really cared for Buggy", but the Impel Down arc turned him into an "engaging character". He said that he believes that Buggy is being set up as a regular character because he was "afraid he might lose him". Pedro Cortes of Japanator said, "Buggy is always good for a laugh, so his bit was a welcomed respite from the oppressive marines beating down Luffy and the Whitebeard pirates."

Galdino
, better known under his Baroque Works code name , is a sculptor with the ability of the Paramecia-type , which allows him to generate and control candle wax. Following the dissolution of the organization, he was captured and taken to Impel Down, where he joined Buggy to escape, then participated in the Marineford War, and subsequently joined Buggy's crew.

He is voiced by Nobuyuki Hiyama in the Japanese version of the franchise. In the English versions of the series, he is voiced by Tom Souhrada in the 4Kids dub, and by Duncan Brannan in the Funimation dub.

Mohji
 is Buggy's first mate and is a beast tamer.

Richie
 is Mohji's pet lion.

Cabaji
is the chief of staff and acrobat who serves as Buggy's third-in-command.

Alvida
 is the captain of the Alvida Pirates until she was defeated by Luffy. When she later resurfaced and sided with Buggy, Alvida gained the powers of the Slip-Slip Fruit which makes her slippery as she also claimed that all her body fat slipped off her.

Red-Haired Pirates
The  are led by "Red-Haired" Shanks.

Shanks

 is a swordsman and pirate, capable of using the Supreme King color of Haki. After serving aboard Roger's ship as an apprentice, alongside Buggy, he founded his own crew, the Red-Haired Pirates. After losing an arm while saving seven-year-old Luffy's life, and lending him his precious straw hat, which was originally owned by his late captain, Gol D. Roger, Shanks goes on to earn himself a place among the Four Emperors. Shanks currently has a bounty of ฿ 4,048,900,000.  Shanks Is capable of utilizing all three types of Haki. and is capable of using the advanced application for Haoshoku Haki.

In the original Japanese series, his voice actor is Shūichi Ikeda. In the 4Kids English adaptation, he is voiced by Tom Souhrada. In the Funimation English adaptation, his voice actor is Brandon Potter. In the Netflix adaptation he will be portrayed by Peter Gadiot.

Whitebeard Pirates
The  are a group led by Whitebeard and sixteen division commanders, each in charge of one hundred men.

Former member Marshall D. Teach leaves and starts his own crew after murdering the fourth division commander .

Edward Newgate
He is a very large and burly old man who fights with a naginata as his weapon and uses the ability of the Paramecia-type  to create shock waves powerful enough to cause earthquakes and tsunamis. Whitebeard was capable of utilizing all three types of Haki. and was capable of using the advanced application for both and Haoshoku and Busoshoku Haki. He is regarded as the world's strongest man and the only one to have matched Gol D. Roger in combat. He considers all of his crewmen as his sons and protects them with all his might. After his crewmember Portgas D. Ace is sentenced to death, he declares war on the Marines and attacks their stronghold with his fleet. Eventually, after being badly wounded in the war, he is killed by the Blackbeard Pirates just before he proclaimed that the One Piece is real and that it indeed exists. After Whitebeard's death, Blackbeard uses an unknown method to steal his Devil Fruit power. At the time of his death, Whitebeard held a bounty of ฿ 5,046,000,000, the second-highest bounty ever for a pirate after Roger.

In the original Japanese series, he was originally voiced by Kinryu Arimoto, until his death on February 1, 2019, and was replaced by Ryūzaburō Ōtomo. In the Funimation English adaptation, his voice is supplied by R Bruce Elliott.

Portgas D. Ace

, also called , is the second division commander of the Whitebeard Pirates and Luffy's older brother. Having eaten the Logia-type , Ace is capable of manipulating, creating, and transforming into fire. Ace was capable of using utilizing all three types of Haki. Eventually, after being saved from execution, he shields Luffy from Akainu's magma attack at the cost of his own life. He is buried on an unnamed island in the New World alongside his captain Whitebeard.

He is voiced by Toshio Furukawa, while he is voiced by Daisuke Sakaguchi as a child. In the 4Kids English adaptation, his names are changed to Portgaz D. Trace and "Heat Fist" Trace, and he is voiced by Jesse Hooker. In the Funimation English adaptation, his name is spelled Portgas D. Ace, and his voice is supplied by Travis Willingham.

Marco
 is the 1st division commander who can transform into a phoenix or phoenix-human hybrid thanks to the powers of the Bird-Bird Fruit: Model Phoenix. He is a skilled user of Haki.

Jozu
 is the 3rd division commander who can turn parts of his body into diamond thanks to the powers of the Twinkle-Twinkle Fruit.

Vista
 is the 5th division commander.

Izo
 is the 16th division commander who was one of Kozuki Oden's retainers in Wano.

World Government

The  is a global organization, affiliated with over 170 countries from around the world. Eight centuries after its foundation by a group of twenty kings, their descendants, the Celestial Dragons, live luxurious lives and abuse their power.

Celestial Dragons

However, due to their connection to the Government, they constantly abuse their power and despise the people below them (referring to them as "commoners") to the point of wearing enclosed helmets with supplied oxygen so as not to breathe the same air as them.

Employees

Cipher Pol
 is a series of World Government organizations. They act as secret agencies who do investigations, assassinations and espionage for the World Government.

Specializing in assassination, they utilize a weapon-themed martial art called the .Some members of CP9 worked undercover on Water 7 for several years, Rob Lucci and Kaku working as shipwrights at the Galley-La Company, Kalifa as Iceberg's secretary, and Blueno as a bartender.

Not much has been revealed about them so far. However, they have been shown to be very feared and influential.

Members of the Cipher Pol include:

 , the second-in-command who is known for ruthlessly and mercilessly enforcing the World Government's "justice". He can transform into a leopard or leopard-human hybrid thanks to the powers of the Cat-Cat Fruit: Model Leopard.
  is Rob Lucci's pet pigeon.
 , the former leader of Cipher Pol 9 and self-centered son of the group's previous leader  who is obsessed over moving up in the World Government. Currently he is a member of the CP-0. Though extremely weak compared to his subordinates, Spandam carries the sword  which is capable of transforming into an elephant or an elephant-sword hybrid after it "ate" the Elephant-Elephant Fruit.
   is a skilled swordsman who can turn into a giraffe or a giraffe-human hybrid thanks ot the powers of the Ox-Ox Fruit: Model Giraffe. When he first appeared, he posed as a shipwright at the Gally-La Company's dock one.
  is the deceptive martial artist who can turn into a wolf of a wolf-human hybrid that resembles a werewolf thanks to the powers of the Dog-Dog Fruit: Model Wolf.
  is an operative who travels great distances with manifested "air doors" thanks to the powers of the Door-Door Fruit. When he first appeared, he posed as a bartender.
  is an operative whose "strength-cleaning" bubbles that turn a person into a slippery mannequin thanks to the powers of the Bubble-Bubble Fruit. When she first appeared, she posed as a secretrary at the Galley-La Company.
  is a man who resembles a kabuki actor and uses an ability called "Life Return" to control every cell in his body.
 , an owl-shaped man with a zipper across his mouth which has to be open in order for him to speak.
  is a man with weasel whiskers who had not fully mastered all the Rokushiki skills and was killed by Lucci for his failure.
  is an operative from the CP6.
  is an operative from the CP7.

Impel Down
 is one of three main locations of the World Government and the world's greatest prison.

Prison's staff include:

  is the Vice Chief Warden, being the Chief Warden before the two year timeskip. He has the ability of the Paramecia-type  that allows him to generate and manipulate poison as well as making him immune to any type of poison. However, his ability does not spare him from diarrhea caused by poisoned food. As a result, he spends about ten hours per day in the bathroom relieving himself.
  is the exceedingly ambitious Chief Warden, being the Vice Chief Warden before the two year timeskip. He often shows off how tough he is to the prisoners, which earns him admiration among the guards. However, he cares more about his own position than the security of the prison. His weapon of choice is a double bladed naginata.
  - A very sadistic woman who uses a thin torturing whip in battle. Saidie is in command of the Jailer Beasts on the lowest level of Impel Down 
  - A chief guard who wields a trident which also functions as a flute to direct his subordinates the Blugori, which are masked creatures resembling blue gorillas.
 The Jailer Beasts are Impel Down staff members who have tapped into the Awakened power of their unnamed Zoan Devil Fruits which makes them larger with some of them having runny noses as well as being able to recover from attacks quicker. Most of them are in their animal-human forms. They consist of:
 Minotaurus - A Jailer Beast who ate a Devil Fruit that enables him to turn into a Holstein cattle.
 Minorhinoceros - A Jailer Beast who ate a Devil Fruit that enables him to turn into a blue rhinoceros.
 Minokoala - A Jailer Beast who ate a Devil Fruit that enables him to turn into a koala
 Minozebra - A Jailer Beast who ate a Devil Fruit that enables him to turn into a zebra.
 Minochihuahua - A Jailer Beast who ate a Devil Fruit that enables him to turn into a chihuahua.

Navy

The , sometimes translated as the "Marines" in FUNimation's English dub, are a maritime force under the command of the World Government. Currently the position of fleet admiral, who is the leader of the organization, is occupied by Akainu. The greatest forces are the three admirals, who are currently Kizaru, Fujitora, and Ryokugyu. The corrupted Captain Ax-Hand Morgan (father of Helmeppo) was the first high-ranking officer of the Navy depicted in the series, until stripped of his status when he was defeated by Luffy.

Sengoku
 is a naval officer and contemporary of Roger who eventually rises to the rank of fleet admiral. The ability of the Mystical Zoan-type  allows Sengoku to transform into a daibutsu or a daibutsu-human hybrid. Sengoku is capable of utilizing all three types of Haki. Following the Paramount War, he retires from the service and, against his recommendation to promote Aokiji, is succeeded by Akainu. Although retired from active duty, Sengoku continues to serve in the navy as an inspector general. Two years after the war, he is shown to have mellowed rather considerably due to his lack of responsibilities. It is also revealed that in the past, he took care of the young Donquixote Rosinante after his brother Donquixote Doflamingo murdered their father, Donquixote Homing. He came to care for Rosinante like a son and was devastated by his death while he was working undercover as a member of the Donquixote Pirates. After Doflamingo's defeat by Luffy, Sengoku learns the truth about the circumstances of Rosinante's death from Trafalgar Law who Rosinante had given his life to protect. Although Law is a pirate, Sengoku allows him to escape because of his connection to Rosinante.

In the Japanese anime television series, he is initially voiced by Takkō Ishimori, later by Tōru Ōkawa. In the Funimation English adaptation, he is initially voiced by Ed Blaylock, later by Philip Weber.

Sakazuki
, better known as Admiral , is a ruthless naval officer with the ability of the Logia-type , which allows him to control, create, or transform into magma. Akainu is a firm believer in "Absolute Justice," going as far as eliminating an entire population should an enemy be hidden there. This was first shown when The Navy eradicated Nico Robin's island of Ohara. Akainu destroyed a refugee evacuation ship simply due to the possibility of even one scholar sneaking on board; his logic was that if even one of the scholars of Ohara had escaped with it, the mission would've been a failure, much to the dismay of Aokiji, who called him a fool for overdoing things. After Sengoku retires, Akainu wins the position of fleet admiral in a duel against Aokiji. His appearance is modeled after Bunta Sugawara.

He is voiced at first by Michio Nakao, later by Fumihiko Tachiki. In the Funimation English adaptation, his voice is supplied by Andrew Love.

Kuzan
, better known as Admiral , was a seemingly lazy but morally upright naval officer with the ability of the Logia-type , which allows him to generate, control, or become ice. On his retirement, Sengoku advocates for Aokiji to succeed him as fleet admiral. Aokiji duels with Akainu for the position, but loses. Not wanting to serve under Akainu, he leaves the Navy thanks to his disillusionment with the World Government's Absolute Justice. It appears he formed an alliance with the Blackbeard Pirates for unknown reasons. Aokiji's appearance is modeled after Yūsaku Matsuda.

He is voiced by Takehito Koyasu. In the Funimation English adaptation, his voice is initially supplied by Bob Carter, later by Jason Douglas.

Borsalino
, better known as Admiral , is an easygoing navy officer with the power of the Logia-type , which allows him to generate, control, or become light as well as fire destructive beams. The character's appearance is modeled after Kunie Tanaka.

He is initially voiced by Unshō Ishizuka, later by Ryōtarō Okiayu. In the Funimation English adaptation, his voice is supplied by Ray Hurd.

Issho
, better known as Admiral , is one of the Navy admirals who joined during the timeskip. He has the ability to control gravity, being able to make the environment heavier or lighter. He is blind, so he uses Color of Observation Haki to feel what is around him.

He wanted to end the Seven Warlords of the Sea system, which is why in Dressrosa he had a conflict against Donquixote Doflamingo and Trafalgar Law, where he later had to team up with the latter and the Straw Hat Pirates to stop Doflamingo's corruption. Despite the fact that the next day he had orders to arrest Luffy, his vision of justice forced him to help him escape. Fujitora's character appearance is modeled after Shintaro Katsu.

In the anime, he is voiced by Ikuya Sawaki. In the Funimation English adaptation, his voice is supplied by Charles C. Campbell.

Aramaki
, better known as Admiral , is the second of the two admirals appointed to their rank during the two-year timeskip, next to Fujitora. He ate the Forest-Forest Fruit, a Devil Fruit power that allows him to generate, control, or become plant life like a forest, trees, and flowers, as well as manipulation of all plant life , whether on a small or massive scale, with vegetation growing wherever he treads. Inter alia, Ryokugyu can summon roots to impale people and objects and then drain them of their moisture and nutrients, which has allowed him to go three years without eating anything the conventional way. While easygoing much like former Admiral Aokiji, Ryokugyu appears to be a supporter of Akainu's brand of Absolute Justice, but however, he is more prone to destroying those who do not side with his brand of "justice", especially when it comes to the World Government authority, unlike Sakazuki . So, thus he is venturing to Wano in order to try and bring down Luffy to get his superior's approval.

Ryokugyu's appearance seems modeled after Japanese actor Yoshio Harada. The admiral was originally voiced by Keiji Fujiwara in the Japanese version of the anime.

Monkey D. Garp
He is famous for cornering Gol D. Roger and considered a hero of the Navy. After Roger's execution, he took care of Roger's son, Ace, raising him like his own grandson. He has superhuman strength, enough to lift and throw cannonballs like baseball pitches. Garp takes both Koby and Helmeppo under his wing. At the end of the war with Whitebeard, Garp retires from the front line and decides to train the next generation of navy personnel.

He is voiced by Hiroshi Naka in the Japanese version of the anime. In the English version of the series, he is voiced by Brian Mathis in the Funimation dub. In the upcoming Netflix live-action series, Garp will be portrayed by Vincent Regan.

Smoker
 is a naval officer and cigar enthusiast, keeping plenty of cigars strapped to the left side of his jacket while smoking two lit ones. Smoker possesses power of the Logia-type  allows him to manipulate, create, and transform into smoke. His weapon is a jutte tipped with sea-prism stone. Upon seeing Luffy smile before miraculously surviving his execution in Loguetown, Smoker came to believe that he is a potential threat, since his attitude during his near demise, mirrored that of Gold Roger when he was executed, Smoker became more confused when Dragon stopped him from killing Luffy. Befuddled by these events, Smoker followed Luffy to the Grand Line and became obsessed with capturing him, to a near stalker like level, which only intensifies upon discovering Luffy is Dragon's son during the Paramount War. Two years after the Paramount War, he is promoted to the rank of vice admiral.

In the Japanese anime series, he is voiced originally by Ginzō Matsuo, later by Mahito Ōba. In the 4Kids English adaptation, referred to as Chaser the "Smoke Hunter", he is voiced by Rusell Velazquez. In the Funimation English adaptation, where he is called Smoker the "White Hunter", his voice is supplied by Greg Dulcie.

Tashigi
 is a naval officer serving as Smoker's second-in-command. While adept at sword fighting, she is unusually clumsy. She is very well-versed in the famous katana, knowing their names and origins. Her stated goal is to remove all meitō, named swords with prestigious histories, from the hands of those who would use them for their own ends. By coincidence, she bears a striking resemblance to Kuina, Zoro's deceased childhood friend, something he is uncomfortable with.

Her voice actress is Junko Noda. In the 4Kids and Funimation English adaptations, she is voiced by Priscilla Everett and Monica Rial, respectively.

Koby
 is the first friend Luffy makes on his journey, finding him forced to work as a chore boy on Alvida's ship. Inspired by Luffy, and with his help, Koby escapes and joins the Navy, where he and Helmeppo pique the interest of Vice Admiral Garp, who takes them under his wing. Eventually, Koby masters the Six Powers skill Shave and begins using Color of Observation Haki. After two years, he became a captain in the Navy.

In the original Japanese series, his voice is supplied by Mika Doi. In the 4Kids English adaptation, he is voiced by Kayzie Rogers. In the Funimation English adaptation, his name is spelled Koby, and his voice is supplied by Leah Clark and Micah Solusod as a teenager.

Morgan
"Axe-Hand"  is a corrupt Navy captain who has an axe for a right hand. He abused his power and held Zoro prisoner until Luffy freed him. Both of them managed to defeat Morgan. The Navy stripped him of his rank and arrested him for the abuse of power he committed.

He is voiced by Banjō Ginga. In the English adaptions of the series, he is voiced by David Brimmer in the 4Kids dub and by Brett Weaver in the FUNimation dub.

Helmeppo
 is the son of the corrupt Navy captain Morgan. He was is introduced as a coward, hiding behind his father's wealth and power. Losing his luxurious life after his father's arrest, he reluctantly joins the Navy where he and Koby become protégés of Garp.

He is voiced by Koichi Nagano in the Japanese version. In the English adaptions of the series, he is voiced by Sean Schemmel in the 4Kids dub. In the Funimation dub, he is voiced by Troy Baker in EPs 2-3 and EP280, before the role was recast to Mike McFarland.

Hina
 is an officer in the Navy and a long-time friend of Smoker's since they were rookies in the Navy. She was introduced as a Navy captain on her debut, being promoted to rear admiral after the timeskip. She is also the superior of Django and Fullbody, who admire her with passion. Hina has the power of the Bind-Bind Fruit that allows her to form restraints on people by swiping her limbs through them, or form a cage when she extend her arms.

She is voiced by Tomoko Naka in the Japanese version. In the 4Kids English version, she is voiced by Kathleen Delaney. In the Funimation English adaptation, her voice is supplied by Jennifer Seman, and by Rachel Messer in One Piece: Stampede.

Django
 is a hypnotist with a habit of moonwalking. Introduced as first mate of the Black Cat Pirates, he eventually befriends the Navy officer Fullbody sometime after Kuro's defeat and joins him in the service as a seaman recruit under the command of Hina, whom they both admire. Django's weapons of choice are chakrams which he uses for throwing, slashing and hypnotizing his enemies.

He is voiced by Kazuki Yao in the Japanese version. In the 4Kids English version, he is voiced by Oliver Wyman. In the Funimation English adaptation, his name is spelled "Jango" and his voice is supplied by Kenny Green.

Fullbody
 was introduced as a smug Navy lieutenant on his visit to the Baratie, where he was ridiculed by Sanji. After helping the pirate Django, he was demoted to a seaman recruit, with Django joining him as subordinates of Hina, whom they both admire.

He is voiced by Hideo Ishikawa in the Japanese version. In the 4Kids English version, he is voiced by Tom Wayland. In the Funimation English adaptation, his voice is supplied by John Burgmeier.

Seven Warlords of the Sea
The , the full title being The , is a group of seven powerful pirates sanctioned by the World Government who hand over a fraction of their loot to the Government. The Government's idea is to use powerful pirates to fight all the lesser ones. Other pirates consider the Warlords to be "government dogs". In exchange for their allegiance, the World Government pardons these pirates for their crimes and removes bounties from their heads. The Seven Warlords are loosely based on the European privateers, government-endorsed pirates considered heroes in their homeland and pillagers in others.

Initially, the group's members are Dracule Mihawk, Sir Crocodile, Donquixote Doflamingo, Bartholomew Kuma, Gecko Moria, Boa Hancock, and Jimbei.

Following the exposure of Baroque Works, Crocodile is replaced by Blackbeard, who soon leaves the group, along with Jimbei, who resigns to side with Whitebeard against the World Government, and Moria, who is discarded by the World Government and narrowly escapes an assassination attempt.

The three open spots are eventually filled during the timeskip by Trafalgar Law, Buggy the Clown, and Edward Weevil. After Law and Doflamingo's actions in Dressrosa are exposed, they both are removed by the World Government.

Later during the Reverie, under the direction of Cobra and Riku Dold III, the member nations vote to abolish the Warlords and the remaining members are stripped of their positions and are being hunted down by the Navy with the intent to capture them with the exception of Kuma.

Characters by place

East Blue people
East Blue is the birthplace of Luffy, Zoro, Nami, and Usopp, and the longtime home of Sanji.

Dawn Island
Dawn Island is Luffy's home. In it is the Goa Kingdom, which is ruled by Sabo's adoptive brother  and his wife .

Shimotsuki Village
Shimotsuki Village is Zoro's hometown, where he and his friend and rival  vowed to become the best swordsmen in the world. After Kuina's death, Zoro asked , Kuina's father and master of the village dojo, to train him as a swordsman in order to fulfill his promise to Kuina.

Syrup Village
Syrup Village is where Usopp lived with his mother . In the village also lives , a girl to whom Usopp always told stories to cheer her up, and who lives in a mansion with her butler, who built the Going Merry, the Straw Hat Pirates' first ship.

Baratie
The Baratie is an ocean-going restaurant where Sanji worked.

Coco Village
Coco Village is Nami's home.

For years, the Arlong Pirates also lived near the village, dominating it with their tyranny until they were defeated by Luffy's crew.

Little Garden
 is an island where dinosaurs and other prehistoric animals still exist.

Drum Island
 is an arctic climate island that Straw Hat Pirates stopped to find a doctor after Nami fell ill from a disease she contracted from Little Garden, and the birthplace of Tony Tony Chopper. Wapol used to be the ruler of Drum Island before he was overthrown.

 was the former minion of Wapol during his rule and was chronologically the first Zoan Devil Fruit user introduced where he ate the Ox-Ox Fruit: Model Bison which enables him to turn into a bison or a bison-human hybrid. When Wapol was defeated by Monkey D. Luffy, the people of Drum Island made him the new King of Drum Island.

 was a doctor on Drum Island and former who took in Tony Tony Chopper and taught him how to be a doctor until he was killed by Wapol.

 is a doctor in her 100s who took in Tony Tony Chopper following Hirluk's death.

Alabasta Kingdom
The  is a desert climate island in the Grand Line ruled by Nefeltari Vivi's father, .

They are dubbed the strongest warriors of Alabasta.

The Straw Hats have been welcomed here thanks to their help saving the kingdom.

Nefeltari Vivi
, first introduced as Baroque Works agent , is the princess of the Alabasta Kingdom. She is usually accompanied by her closest friend, an ostrich-sized duck-like flightless bird. She and Karoo sailed for a time with the Straw Hat Pirates when they entered the Grand Line, with the goal of bringing her to Alabasta, being aided by them in her fight against Baroque Works. Due to her time accompanying the Straw Hat Pirates, she is considered just another member of the crew by the members who traveled with her.

Vivi was ranked as #82 in a survey conducted by Newtype for favorite anime heroine in 2002.

Her voice actress is Misa Watanabe. In the 4Kids English adaptation, she is voiced by Karen Neil. In the Funimation English adaptation, her name is spelled Vivi Nefertari, and her voice is supplied by Caitlin Glass.

Skypiea

Skypiea is inhabitited by the original inhabitants of Angel Island, who for a long time, was dominated by Enel until the return of the previous ruler, receiving the title of "God" from the island. Other inhabitants of Angel Island include , his daughter , and their pet "cloud fox" .

On the island also lives , a giant snake over 400 years old.

With the exception of Gan Fall, most of the inhabitants of Skypiea are shown to have bird-like wings on their back. Though for some reason, they haven't been using them to fly for some unknown reason.

Water 7
 is a city with water-ways and canals that are used for transportation almost like roads, often surrounded by sidewalks on the canals.

In the city, there is also the Franky Family which was led by Franky before joining the Straw Hat Pirates.

Several CP9 members also lived undercover in the city.

Sabaody Archipelago
 is the final destination in Paradise, close to the Red Line. There lives the former first mate of the Roger Pirates, Silvers Rayleigh, along with his wife , most commonly known by her nickname "Shakky", a former pirate who works as a bartender.

On the island is the Auction House, where , a subordinate of the Donquixote Pirates, ran it by auctioning slaves, until his business was ruined after the incident caused by Luffy.

Being the final destination of the first half of the Grand Line, rookie pirates who arrive on the place with a bounty greater than 100,000,000 are known as "Super Rookies". This includes members of the "Eleven Supernovas" of the Worst Generation, the Caribou Brothers, Cavendish, and Bartolomeo.

Fishman Island
The average fishman has ten times the strength of a human, can breathe underwater, and swim very fast.

The sons of the royal family are the three princes the shark-type merman  who is the eldest son, oarfish-type merman  who is the middle son, and opah-type merman  who is the youngest son. Together, they are known as the Neptune Brothers. The family's youngest child is Neptune's daughter, the smelt-witing-type mermaid , who became good friends with Luffy when she met him.

Also members of the Sun Pirates, the Arlong Pirates and the New Fishman Pirates come from the island.

Punk Hazard people
 is an island which is half hot and half cold, because Akainu and Aokiji fought there for the post of fleet admiral. On the island lives Caesar Clown and his henchmen who have aspects of mythological creatures like centaurs and satyrs, because Trafalgar Law gave them animal parts to replace their wrecked legs.

The island is also inhabited by children, kidnapped by Caesar, who are used for his gigantification experiments to make giants.

Caesar Clown
 is a psychopathic former navy scientist capable of transforming into gas due to the Logia-type . He is a former colleague of Dr. Vegapunk and a leading expert on chemical weapons of mass destruction. He works for Donquixote Doflamingo creating artificial Devil Fruits called SMILEs, and using kidnapped children in Punk Hazard for his experiments. He is also a direct subordinate of the Donquixote Pirates. After his defeat at the hands of Monkey D. Luffy, he is taken to Dressrosa by the Straw Hat Pirates and Trafalgar Law as a prisoner to make a hostage swap with Doflamingo.

In the anime series, he is voiced by Ryūsei Nakao in the Japanese version of the anime and by Jerry Jewell in the Funimation dub.

Monet
Her bird parts were the replacements for her original parts. She was killed when Caesar Clown accidentally stabbed her removed heart instead of Smoker's removed heart.

Brownbeard Pirates
The  was a pirate group who had their lower body parts replaced by animal parts by Trafalgar Law after they were badly defeated by Basil Hawkins.

Brownbeard
 is the captain of the Brownbeard Pirates who has alligator legs added by Law making him an alligator-type centaur. He and his remaining crew members helped to form the Centaur Patrol Unit which worked for Caesar Clown. After Caesar Clown was defeated, Brownbeard and his crew surrendered to Smoker.

Other Brownbeard Pirates members
Other members of Brownbeard's crew include Smooge, who resembles a normal centaur; Chappe, who resembles a cattle-type centaur; Run, who resembles a drider; Hyoutauros, who resembles a jaguar-type centaur; Kirintauros, who resembles a giraffe-type centaur; an unidentified doe-type centaur, an unidentified rhinoceros-type centaur, an unidentified zebra-type centaur, and an unidentified tapir-type centaur.

Dressrosa
 is a kingdom within the New World. Years later Donquixote Doflamingo stages a mutiny and dethrones King Dold, until he was defeated by Luffy, helping the Riku Family to rule again.

Viola
 is the former second princess of Dressrosa. After Doflamingo's defeat, Viola becomes the crown princess of Dressrosa after her niece Rebecca abdicated her position. The  she ate gives her the ability to see through everything, even other people's minds, allowing her to read thoughts.

In the anime series, her voice actress is Mie Sonozaki, while in the Funimation English adaptation, she is voiced by Cristina Vee.

Tontatta Tribe
The  are a group of dwarves living on Tontatta Kingdom, a little kingdom hidden in Green Bit, an island next to Dressrosa. , Gancho's daughter and the tribe's princess, has the power of the Heal-Heal Fruit that gives her the ability to instantly heal any living being's injury with her tears which is why the Donquixote Pirates kidnapped her for their SMILE factory until she was released by her tribe members. The Tonta Corps are the armed forces of the tribe.

Germa Kingdom
The  is Sanji's fatherland. It is ruled by Sanji's father . Sanji's mother  died when he was a child.

Wano Country
The  is a nation in the New World unaffiliated with the World Government. It has its own warriors, the samurai, who are swordsmen so strong that not even the Navy goes near them. It was first mentioned by Hogback as Ryuma was from there.

In Punk Hazard, the Straw Hat Pirates met two residents of Wano, Kin'emon and his "son" Momonosuke, who temporarily accompanied them on their journey. Later, they discover that Momonosuke is actually the son of Kozuki Oden, and part of the royal family of Wano, and Kin'emon is actually his father's retainer.

Kozuki Oden
, in addition to having been the daimyo of Kuri and son of the country's former shogun Kozuki Sukiyaki, was also a legendary, immensely powerful, and skilled Swordsman and Samurai who developed his own variation of Nitoryu. Oden was specialized in the style of two swords, just like the legendary Samurai Miyamoto Musashi, and his legendary dual wielding swordsmanship allowed him to give the Mythical Zoan enhanced nigh-indestructible Kaido, a massive and deep permanent scar.

Additionally, he was the leader of a group of legendary and powerful samurai known as the Nine Red Scabbards, with all of them serving as his retainers and most trusted allies. As daimyo of Kuri, Oden had a large amount of power and influence over the region before his death. Oden became a famous pirate for several years by joining the Whitebeard Pirates, and later on the Roger Pirates. Oden was regarded as being a tremendously powerful pirate with a great level of influence in both crews.

In life, Oden is one of the strongest characters in the One Piece world. He's one of the very small number of people who could use all three types of Haki (Color of the Supreme King, Color of Arms Haki, Color of Observation Haki), has the ability to hear the "Voice of All Things" (Like Roger), and wields two legendary swords: Ame no Habakiri, the sword said to be able to cut "heaven" itself, and Enma, the sword said to be able to cut to the "bottom of hell". With those in hand, he's able to clash with the likes of Whitebeard and Kaido. Due to his fearsome strength and affiliation with the Whitebeard Pirates and the Roger Pirates, Oden received a bounty (the amount of which is unknown).

In the anime series, Oden is voiced by Hiroya Ishimaru in Japanese, and Robbie Daymond in the Crunchyroll English dub.

Kozuki family
Other members of the Kozuki Family are:

 Oden's wife  who had the ability to send people into the future thanks to the powers of the Time-Time Fruit.
 , Oden's son and Hiyori's big brother. He and some retainers where sent ahead in time by Kozuki Toki where he wound end up eating an artificial version of the Fish-Fish Fruit: Model Azure Dragon that Dr. Vegapunk once created. He ended up being aged up 20 years by Shinobu during the war in Onigashima. Momonosuke became the Shogun after Kaido's defeat.
 , Oden's daughter and Momonosuke's younger sister, who has been hiding her identity by becoming known as Komurasaki, working as an oiran of the tayu (太夫 tayū?) rank, the highest of all.

After the war in Onigashima, it was revealed that , Oden's father and the previous Shogun who was believed to be dead for decades, was under the identity of the legendary blacksmith Tenguyama Hitetsu all along. Even after Orochi was overthrown, Sukiyaki remained hidden over what he allowed to befall Wano Country. His teapot  "ate" the Dog-Dog Fruit: Model Tanuki which gives it the appearance of a tanuki/teapot hybrid.

Oden's retainers
Oden's retainers are:

  - The leader of the Nine Red Scabbards.
  - A retainer who for years became a Yakuza boss to hide his identity.
  - A retainer who became later on a member of the Whitebeard Pirates.
  - Izo's sister.
  - A retainer who has the ability to give life to the drawings thanks to the powers of the Brush-Brush Fruit and in truth is a spy for Kurozumi Orochi. She was lethally wounded by Kine'mon.
  - A ninja.
  - A retainer who was once called Kuri's monster and after Oden's death went back to being a bandit.
  - A Japanese pufferfish-type fishman who pretends to be a kappa
 Dogstorm and Cat Viper.

Other residents in Wano

Kurozumi Orochi
Orochi was later betrayed by Kaido to further his goals. After the defeat of Kaido, Orochi, and Big Mom, the tyranny in Wano has finally ended and Momonosuke became the rightful Shogun of Wano.

Yamato

Kaido's daughter , allies with Luffy against Kaido. Yamato was inspired by Oden's death and proclaimed she would adopt his will of freeing Wano from Kaido's tyranny. Yamato is imprisoned by Kaido for this rebellion, and is able to read Oden's logbook with the help of three Wano samurai and befriends Ace. Yamato idolizes Oden and aims to follow Oden's dream of leaving the country. Yamato is later revealed to have the powers of the Dog-Dog Fruit: Model Okuchi no Makami which enables her to become an Okuchi no Makami (a fictional Japanese wolf deity) or an Okuchi no Makami-human hybrid which can produce cold and ice attacks. Yamato Is capable of utilizing all three of types Haki. and is capable of using the advanced application for both and Haoshoku and Busoshoku Haki

Other characters, groups and organizations

Dr. Vegapunk
Dr.  is a scientist who is immersed in his work. While originally the director of MADS before the group was arrested, Vegapunk was brought into the Marines as it's head scientist. Some of his achievements when working for the Marines have included but are not limited to using seastones on the hulls of ships to keep the Sea Kings away, researching the Lineage Factor, creating artificial lifeforms, doing gigantification research, figuring out how to make an inanimate object "eat" a Devil Fruit, doing cyborg modifications to people, working on warping technology, and a Den Den Mushi that can broadcast anything across the world.

Dr. Vegapunk did not show up in person until the Egghead Arc when the Straw Hat Pirates found him on the winter island of Egghead.

Dr. Vegapunk originally had an enlarged head the size of a giant as a side effect of eating the Brain Brain Fruit which enabled him to absorb and store a lot of information that he has learned. He would later split his brain and place them into different satellites who assist in his research like the Seraphim Project.

Dr. Vegapunk's satellites
Dr. Vegapunk's satellites all share parts of his brain. The following make up Dr. Vegapunk's satellites:

Lilith operates a giant mecha called the Vega Force 1 and has power over the cyborg Sea Beasts that she created.
Atlas was responsible for being behind the creation of a cooking machine that can use an unknown substance to make a variety of food, lifelike holograms, and jetpacks.
While she can become fat after eating food, she can become slim again after she goes to the bathroom.

Baroque Works
 is a secret organization of more than two thousand members whose aim is to stage a coup d'état in the Alabasta Kingdom. Using code names, Mr. 0 (Sir Crocodile) and Ms. All-Sunday (Nico Robin) serve as the organization's president and vice-president respectively. Taking orders directly from them are thirteen male agents, who use the code names Mr. 1 through Mr. 13, and their female partners, who use code names taken from days of the week or holidays and happy events.

Agents Mr. 1 through Mr. 5, and their partners, are called Officer Agents and entrusted with only the most important of missions.

  is an Officer Agent whose body possesses the qualities of bladed steel thanks to the powers of the Dice-Dice Fruit. , a.k.a.  when she works as a bartender, is Daz Bones' partner whose body can grow spikes thanks to the powers of the Spike-Spike Fruit. They work together as Mr. 1 and 
 Mr. 2 Bon Clay, being a drag queen, serves as his own partner.
 Mr. 4, who fights using a four-ton baseball bat and a bazooka that can transform into a dachshund or a dachshund-bazooka hybrid after it "ate" the Dog-Dog Fruit: Model Daschund.  is Mr. 4's partner who can transform into a mole or a mole-human hybrid thanks to the powers of the Mole-Mole Fruit.
 Mr. 5 can cause explosions with any part of his body, including his mucus and breath, thanks to the powers of the Bomb-Bomb Fruit. His partner  can change her weight at will thanks to the powers of the Kilo-Kilo Fruit.

Sir Crocodile
, is a pirate with the ability of the Logia-type , allowing him to generate and control sand, absorb moisture with his right hand, and, as long as he is not wet, turn his body into sand. He wears a large golden alloy hook in place of a left hand, which contains a potent poison and a dagger underneath.

In the original Japanese series, he is voiced by Ryūzaburō Ōtomo. In the 4Kids adaptation, Crocodile is voiced by David Brimmer. In the Funimation English adaptation, his voice is supplied by John Swasey.

Bentham
He has a flamboyant attitude which includes singing and performing ballet moves. He is the only Baroque Works Officer Agent without a female partner, because as a transvestite, he fills both roles himself. Likewise, his code name is a composite of a male Officer Agent's number, "Mr. 2", and a female Official Agent's holiday code name, "Bon Clay", which represents the Bon Festival and year-end festivals.

In the original Japanese series, he is voiced by Kazuki Yao. In the 4Kids English adaptation, he is voiced by Kevin Kolack. In the Funimation English adaptation, his voice is supplied by Barry Yandell.

Easter Egg characters
In the series, some characters usually appear as Easter egg making different cameos in the scenes as recurring jokes.

Revolutionary Army
The  is an army of globally operating revolutionaries, openly aiming to overthrow the World Government. To that end, they incite revolutions in countries around the world. The organization is led by the world's most wanted man, Monkey D. Dragon, who is known to the public only as Dragon. Also unknown to the public are his family ties; he is the son of Garp and father of Luffy. Next in command after Dragon is Sabo, Luffy's sworn brother.

The organization commanders are the commander of the East Army. Each one leads the division of each sea. They consist of:

 , a woman with the power to cheer people up by waving a flag thanks ot the powers of the Pump-Pump Fruit.
 The commander of the South Army , a scientist cat-type mink.

Dragon's comrade , nicknamed , is the commander of the G Army which covers the Grand Line, and the queen of the  kingdom . He can inject hormones into a person's body by making his finger nails into syringes, creating various effects like increased healing abilities, increased vigor, or changing the person's gender thanks to the powers of the Horm-Horm Fruit.

Before the events in Dressrosa, they were based on Baltigo, but after Blackbeard attacked the island because of the presence of one of his commanders, they moved to Kamabakka Kingdom.

Monkey D. Dragon
, commonly known simply as "Dragon the Revolutionary", is the father of the Straw Hat Pirates Captain Monkey D. Luffy and the son of the naval hero Monkey D. Garp. He is the infamous leader and founder of the Revolutionary Army who has been attempting to overthrow the World Government. Not much is known about his activities, background, history, or power. He is the World Government's greatest enemy, and is the most dangerous and most wanted man in the world. Dragon's family ties were revealed to the world, following the end of the Battle of Marineford. 

He is voiced by Hidekatsu Shibata. In the 4Kids English adaptation, he was voiced by Dan Green, and in the Funimation English version of the series, he is voiced by Bryan Massey.

Sabo
 is the chief of staff of the Revolutionary Army and sworn brother to Luffy and Ace. Introduced as a noble from the Goa Kingdom years before the series' present, Sabo leaves his home and family to live in the Gray Terminal. After he and Ace befriend Luffy, the three of them exchange cups of sake and become "brothers" (similar to the initiation ritual in yakuza organizations). Sabo's ship is destroyed by a Celestial Dragon. Though he is thought to have been killed in the attack, Sabo survived and was rescued by Monkey D. Dragon, though he suffers from amnesia. At some point, he joins the Revolutionary Army and becomes its chief of staff. After reading of Ace's death in the newspaper, Sabo's memory returns and, like Luffy, is devastated by his death. Sabo becomes determined to obtain Ace's Devil Fruit, the Flame-Flame Fruit, in order to inherit Ace's will. He later finds it as the prize of a tournament on Dressrosa, where he takes Luffy's place by using Luffy's alias "Lucy". After winning the tournament, Sabo eats the Flame-Flame Fruit where he gains its abilities and battles Admiral Fujitora and Jesus Burgess in an effort to protect Luffy.

He is voiced by Tōru Furuya while he is voiced as a child by Junko Takeuchi. In the Funimation English adaptation of One Piece Film: Gold and Episode of Sabo, his voice is supplied by Vic Mignogna. In One Piece: Stampede, his English voice is supplied by Johnny Yong Bosch.

Bartholomew Kuma
The  , is one of the Seven Warlords of the Sea; the only one with a reputation for complete obedience to the World Government, when in fact he is an officer of the Revolutionary Army. The power of the Paramecia-type  allows his palms to repel anything, from physical objects such as people or air to abstracts such as pain and fatigue. He can use this ability to safely transport himself or others over long distances. Their bodies are made of a substance harder than steel, and they can shoot powerful blasts from their mouths that can melt metal. The other Pacifista look just like Kuma, sharing his towering, bear-like stature, but lack the Paw-Paw Fruit's ability. Instead, they possess the ability to shoot laser beams from their palms. At some point during his gradual conversion into the human weapon "PX-0", Kuma's personality is erased, leaving him a programmable fighting machine under the Government's control until becoming a slave-to-rent for the World Nobles as punishment for aiding Luffy.

In the original Japanese series, he is voiced by Hideyuki Hori. Joel McDonald provides his voice in the Funimation English adaptation.

God's Army

The Priests and Eneru are also skilled users of the Color of Observation Haki, which they refer to as

Enel
 is the "God" of Skypiea. Though "God" is traditionally the title only for the island's ruler, he takes it literally, forcing the population to worship and serve him. The Logia-type  grants him the ability to manipulate, generate, and transform into electricity which can't harm Luffy. He can also use Observation Haki, called  on Skypiea. Used in conjunction, these abilities extend his hearing over the entire country and allow him to immediately punish those who speak up against him. Enel's overly long earlobes reach down to his chest, similar to some depictions of Buddha, and like the god of thunder and storms, Raijin, he wears a ring of drums, showing a tomoe on the drumhead, on his back. After his defeat at the hands of Luffy, Enel pilots his ship the Ark Maxim into outer space where he lands on the Moon and befriends the local Space Pirates.

In the original Japanese series, Enel is voiced by Toshiyuki Morikawa. In the 4Kids Adaptation, his voice actor is Wayne Grayson. In the Funimation English adaptation, his voice actor is J. Michael Tatum.

Mink Tribe
The  is a tribe of various anthropomorphic animals living on a gigantic elephant named "Zunesha" as the island is known as "Zou". The Mink Tribe's city is known as the Mokomo Dukedom. The Mokomo Dukedom is led by Dogstorm and Cat Viper. The Mink Tribe is loyal to the Kozuki Family from Wano Country as they shared unbreakable ancestral bonds. The red colored Poneglyph belongs to the Mink Tribe, which proves to be a very useful information to find Raftel.

Other members include , a canine-type mink and a ruler's aide, and Carrot.

Other members of the tribe include the Heart Pirates' navigator Bepo, the Big Mom Pirates' combatant Pekoms, and the Revolutionary Army commander Lindbergh.

Dogstorm and Cat Viper

As children they came to Wano Country, where they became retrainers of Kozuki Oden, whom years later they accompanied on his journey at sea as crew members of the Whitebeard Pirates, and later as members of the Roger Pirates. When Oden died, they both blamed each other for failing to protect him, later returning to Zou, where at some point they became rulers, and harboring a grudge for years by avoiding seeing each other.

Due to an invasion of Zou by the Animal Kingdom Pirates led by Jack, Dogstorm lost half a leg, while Cat Viper lost half an arm. When the Straw Hat Pirates and the Heart Pirates arrived in Zou, they formed an alliance with them and the Kozuki Clan to travel to Wano and end Kaido's tyranny.

Carrot
 is a rabbit-type mink member of Dogstorm's Musketeers and a ruler's aide. Eager to travel around the world and see the seas, she infiltrates the Thousand Sunny as the Straw Hat Pirates set out on their journey to Totto Land to rescue Sanji, and remains on with the crew during their trip to Wano Country. Carrot is an extremely skilled fighter, possessing extraordinary agility and speed and, as a rabbit, is capable of taking very high jumps. In combat, she uses clawed gauntlets that Pedro, who was her trainer, gave her when she was younger. Like the other members of the Mink tribe, under the full moon Carrot transformed into a ferocious berserker with incredible speed, strength, the power to fly and lightning powers. After the events in the Wano Country, Dogstorm and Cat Viper propose to her to become the future ruler of the Minks.

In the original Japanese series, Carrot is voiced by Kanae Itō. In the Funimation English adaptation, she is voiced by Tia Ballard.

Reception
Allen Divers of Anime News Network comments that the male character designs of One Piece are "often quite varied and unique", while the female ones become "a bit repetitive". He also notes that, as the characters are "defined by what they seek", there is little room "for actual development". Todd Douglass, Jr. of DVD Talk simply states that the series' characters have a lot of "charm". His colleague Carl Kimlinger describes the visual style of One Piece as "unconventional" with "grotesquely exaggerated expressions, simple eyes, big mouths and bigger teeth", "supremely ugly supporting characters and skinny, gangly-limbed main cast" and comments that "it's all amazingly distinctive, utterly appropriate, and surprisingly cool—in a goofy kind of way". He also notes that "Funimation's English dub is light-years better than the 4Kids debacle", "unusually accurate, professional, and largely enjoyable, which is far, far more than can be said of the previous dub". He laments that Funimation's version of "Crocodile loses his sepulchral charisma" and that "the original's fine dance on the edge of mawkish sentimentality is disrupted often enough by less-than-stellar acting". He also states that "Colleen Clinkenbeard's Luffy is more a generic spunky kid than a personality in his own right, really coming to life only during the action scenes during which she does a fine job of being darned cool."

Dustin Somner of Blu-ray.com comments that the Japanese and Funimation voice-acting is "fairly good, but not exceptional" and sometimes "overly zany". Todd Douglass Jr. of DVD Talk notes "the daunting cast of characters, both good and bad" as "one of the appealing factors" of the anime, but also comments that "Some of the voices [of the 4Kids dub] were pretty irritating ... with a lot of high-pitches and over exaggerated speech." Brigitte Schönhense of Splashcomics comments that the "brilliant" flashbacks into the characters' pasts make them so "likeable and lovable" (German: "sympathisch und liebenswert") and that they are the manga's real strength. Mania Entertainment writer Jarred Pine comments that Oda's characters are "whacky" and that his "bizarre" character designs create "wonderful characterizations and personalities". He notes the "well illustrated" facial expressions and says that "it's the whacky characterizations and designs that makes One Piece its own". His colleague Bryce Coulter comments that "One Pieces bizarre character designs will keep your attention as they can be very random and often memorable. Not the prettiest, but it will definitely capture your attention."

Notes

References

Citations

One Piece manga

Entire series
 Oda, Eiichiro. One Piece. 93 vols. San Francisco: Viz Media, 2003–2020.
 Oda, Eiichiro. ワンピース [One Piece] (in Japanese). 96 vols. Tokyo: Shueisha, 1997–2020.

Individual volumes

 
One Piece
Characters